This list of accidents and incidents involving commercial aircraft includes notable events that have a corresponding Wikipedia article. Entries in this list involve passenger or cargo aircraft that are operating commercially and meet this list's size criteriapassenger aircraft with a seating capacity of at least 10 passengers, or commercial cargo aircraft of at least . The list is grouped by the year in which the accident or incident occurred.


1910s and 1920s

1919 
 July 21 – The Goodyear dirigible Wingfoot Air Express catches fire and crashes into the Illinois Trust and Savings Building in Chicago, Illinois, while carrying passengers to a local amusement park, killing thirteen people: three out of the five on board and ten others on the ground, with 27 others on the ground being injured.
 August 2 – A Caproni Ca.48 crashes at Verona, Italy, during a flight from Venice to Taliedo, Milan, killing all on board (14, 15, or 17 people, according to different sources).

1920 
 December 14 – A Handley Page O/400 hits a tree and crashes at Golders Green, London, after failing to gain height following takeoff, killing four out of eight on board.

1922 
 March 31 – A Beijing-Han Airlines Handley Page O/7 hits trees and crashes while landing at Beijing Nanyuan Airport, killing all 14 on board in China's first fatal aviation accident.
 April 7 – In the Pidddcardie mid-air collision, a de Havilland DH.18A, G-EAWO, operated by Daimler Hire Ltd., collides with a Farman F.60 Goliath, F-GEAD, operated by Compagnie des Grands Express Aériens (CGEA), over the Thieulloy-St. Antoine road near Picardie, France, killing all seven people on both aircraft. This is the first mid-air collision of two airliners.

1923 
 May 14 – An Air Union Farman F.60 Goliath crashes near Monsures, Somme, France, due to the structural failure of a wing, killing all six on board.
 August 27 – An Air Union Farman F.60 Goliath crashes near East Malling, Kent, England, due to engine failure, and confusion among the passengers, killing one of 13 on board.
 September 14 – A Daimler Airway de Havilland DH.34 crashes at Ivinghoe, Buckinghamshire, England, after stalling while attempting an emergency landing, killing all five on board.

1924 
 December 24 – An Imperial Airways de Havilland DH.34 crashes near Purley, Surrey, England, due to a stall during an attempted emergency landing in response to an unknown mechanical defect, killing all eight on board.

1926 
 August 18 – An Air Union Blériot 155 crashes during a failed emergency landing attempt at College Farm in Aldington, Kent, England, after experiencing engine failure; two of the 15 on board are killed on impact and the pilot dies of his injuries one day later.
 October 2 – An Air Union Blériot 155 crashes at Leigh, Kent, England, after the aircraft catches fire in mid-air during an attempted emergency landing at Penshurst Airfield, killing both crew members and all five passengers; this is the first in-flight fire to occur on an airliner.

1927 
 August 22 – A KLM Fokker F. VIII crashes near Sevenoaks, Kent, England, due to structural failure of the tailfin, killing one of 11 on board.

1928 
 July 13 – An Imperial Airways Vickers Vulcan crashes on a test flight from Croydon Airport, England, with a pilot and five passengers near Purley, Surrey,  from the airport, with the death of four passengers.

1929 
 June 17 – An Imperial Airways Handley Page W.10 ditches in the English Channel due to engine failure, killing seven of the 13 on board.
 September 6 – An Imperial Airways de Havilland Hercules crashes whilst landing at Jask Airport, Iran, killing three of the five occupants.
 November 6 – A Junkers G 24 crashes near Marden Park in Godstone, Surrey, England; killing 7 of the eight occupants.

1930s

1930 
 February 10 – An Air Union Farman F.63 Goliath crashes during an emergency landing at Marden Airfield, Marden, Kent, following failure of the right tailplane, killing two of six on board.
 October 5 – On its maiden voyage from the United Kingdom to British India, the British civil airship R101 crashes and burns in Allonne, Oise, France, while flying at low altitude at night in a rainstorm, killing 48 out of 54 on board, the worst civil airship disaster in history.

1931 
 March 21 – An Australian National Airways Avro 618 Ten, Southern Cloud, disappears in severe weather on a flight from Sydney to Melbourne, killing all eight on board in Australia's first significant airline disaster; the crash site in the Snowy Mountains remains undiscovered until 1958.
 March 31 – A Transcontinental & Western Air Fokker F-10 Trimotor crashes near Bazaar, Kansas, after a wing breaks off in flight, killing all eight aboard, including University of Notre Dame football coach Knute Rockne.

1933 
 March 28 – The 1933 Imperial Airways Dixmude crash in Belgium of an Armstrong Whitworth Argosy II is the first suspected case of air sabotage; all 15 on board are killed.
 October 10 – United Air Lines Trip 23, a Boeing 247, is destroyed by a bomb over Chesterton, Indiana, United States, in the first proven case of air sabotage on a commercial aircraft; all seven on board are killed.
 December 30 – In the 1933 Imperial Airways Ruysselede crash in Belgium, an Avro Ten collides with a radio mast, killing all 10 on board.

1934 
 February 23 – A United Air Lines Boeing 247 crashes into a Utah canyon in bad weather, killing all eight on board.
 May 9 – An Air France Wibault 282T crashes into the English Channel off Dungeness, Kent, killing all six on board.
 July 27 – A Swissair Curtiss T-32 Condor II crashes near Tuttlingen, Germany, after a wing separates in a thunderstorm, killing all 12 passengers and crew on board.
 October 2 – A Hillman's Airways de Havilland Dragon Rapide crashes into the English Channel off Folkestone, Kent, due to pilot error, killing all seven on board.

1935 
 May 6 – TWA Flight 6, a Douglas DC-2 operating a multi-leg flight from Los Angeles, California, to Newark, New Jersey, United States, crashes on farmland near Atlanta, Macon, or Kirksville, Missouri, due to poor visibility and depleted fuel; five of the 13 on board are killed, including Senator Bronson M. Cutting.
 October 7 – United Air Lines Trip 4, a Boeing 247D flying from Salt Lake City, Utah, to Cheyenne, Wyoming, United States, crashes near Silver Crown, Wyoming, due to pilot error; all 12 people on board die.
 December 10 – A SABENA Savoia-Marchetti S.73 crashes near Tatsfield, Surrey, England, due to pilot error, while en route from Brussels Airport, Belgium, to Croydon Airport in South London; all 11 people on board die in the accident.

1936 
 January 14 – American Airlines Flight 1, a Douglas DC-2, crashes into a swamp near Goodwin, Arkansas, killing all 17 passengers and crew on board; the cause is never determined.
 April 7 – TWA Flight 1, a Douglas DC-2, crashes near Uniontown, Pennsylvania, United States, due to pilot error, killing 12 of the 14 passengers and crew aboard.
 June 16 – In the Havørn Accident, a Norwegian Air Lines Junkers Ju 52 crashes into Lihesten mountain in Hyllestad, Norway, killing all seven on board.
 August 5 – Chicago and Southern Flight 4, a Lockheed Model 10 Electra, crashes after takeoff due to pilot error, killing all eight on board.
 December 9 – A KLM Douglas DC-2 crashes on takeoff from Croydon Airport, England; 15 of 17 on board die.
 December 27 – United Airlines Trip 34, a Boeing 247, crashes at Rice Canyon (near Newhall, California, United States) due to pilot error, killing all 12 on board.

1937 

 January 12 – Western Air Express Flight 7, a Boeing 247, crashes into a mountain near Newhall, California, United States. Five of the 13 people aboard die, including famed adventurer, author and filmmaker, Martin Johnson.
 February 19 – An Airlines of Australia Stinson Model A suffers controlled flight into terrain in Queensland, killing four of the seven people on board.
 March 25 – TWA Flight 15A, a Douglas DC-2 crashes in Clifton, Pennsylvania due to ice accumulation. All 13 passengers and crew are killed.
 May 6 – The Zeppelin Hindenburg bursts into flames and crashes while attempting a landing at Naval Air Engineering Station, Lakehurst, New Jersey, United States; of the 97 people on board, 35 are killed; one person on the ground also dies.
 November 16 – The 1937 Sabena Junkers Ju 52 Ostend crash kills all 11 on board, including the Grand Duke Georg Donatus and Grand Duchess Cecilie of Hesse.

1938 
 January 10 – Northwest Airlines Flight 2, a Lockheed L14H Super Electra, crashes near Bozeman, Montana, United States, killing all 10 on board; the machine with which the manufacturer measured component vibration is found to be inaccurate, causing the aircraft to be more prone to flutter than anticipated.
 January 11 – Pan American World Airways Flight 1, a Sikorsky S-42 flying boat named the Samoan Clipper, explodes in mid-air over Pago Pago, American Samoa, killing all seven on board.
 March 1 – TWA Flight 8, a Douglas DC-2, disappears on a flight from San Francisco to Winslow, Arizona; the aircraft is found three months later on a mountain in Yosemite National Park; all nine on board die.
 July 28 – Pan American World Airways Flight 229, a Martin M-130 flying boat named the Hawaii Clipper, disappears over the Pacific Ocean westbound from Guam to Manila with 15 on board.
 October 25 – Kyeema, an Australian National Airways Douglas DC-2 crashes in heavy fog into Mount Dandenong in Victoria, Australia, killing all 18 people on board.
 November 4 – In the 1938 Jersey Airport disaster, a Jersey Airways de Havilland DH.86 crashes on takeoff from Jersey Airport due to pilot error; all 13 passengers and crew lose their lives as well as one person on the ground.

1939 
 January 13 – Northwest Airlines Flight 1, a Lockheed L14H Super Electra, crashes on descent to Miles City, Montana, United States, after an intense fire breaks out in the cockpit due to a fuel leak from the aircraft's cross-feed fuel valve; all four on board are killed.
 August 13 – A Pan Am Sikorsky S-43 crashes into Guanabara Bay, Brazil, due to loss of control following engine failure, killing 12 of the 14 on board.

1940s

1940 
 June 14 – In the Kaleva shootdown, an Aero Junkers Ju 52 en route from Tallinn, Estonia, to Helsinki, Finland, is shot down by two Soviet bombers over the Gulf of Finland during peacetime; all nine on board are killed.
 August 31 – In the Lovettsville air disaster, Pennsylvania Central Airlines Trip 19, a Douglas DC-3A, crashes at Lovettsville, Virginia, United States, during an intense thunderstorm; all 25 on board die.
 November 8 – A Deutsche Lufthansa Ju 90 crashes near Schönteichen in Saxony, Germany, after ice forms on the tail, killing all 29 passengers and crew on board.

1941 
 February 26 – Eastern Air Lines Flight 21, a Douglas DC-3, crashes while descending to land at Atlanta, Georgia, United States, killing eight of 16 aboard; World War I hero and Eastern Air Lines president Eddie Rickenbacker is among the survivors.
 October 30 – American Airlines Flight 1, a Douglas DC-3, stalls and crashes at Lawrence Station, Ontario, Canada while attempting to find a place to land, killing all 20 on board; the cause of the crash is never determined.
 October 30 – Northwest Airlines Flight 5, a Douglas DC-3, crashes at Moorhead, Minnesota in fog due to icing; of the 15 on board, only the pilot survived.

1942 
 January 30 – Qantas Short Empire G-AEUH is shot down by seven Japanese fighters and crashes  from East Timor; 13 of 18 on board are killed.
 October 23 – American Airlines Flight 28, a Douglas DC-3, crashes near Palm Springs, California, United States, after being struck by a U.S. Army Air Corps Lockheed B-34 bomber; all 12 aboard the airliner are killed, while the bomber lands safely with minor damage.

1943 
 January 21 – Pan Am Flight 1104, a Martin M-130 nicknamed the Philippine Clipper, crashes into a mountain near Boonville, California, United States, due to pilot error; all 19 occupants are killed, including Rear Admiral Robert H. English, the serving submarine commander of the US Pacific Fleet.
 June 1 – BOAC Flight 777, a Douglas DC-3 flying from Lisbon in Portugal, to Bristol, England, is shot down by Luftwaffe fighter aircraft over the Bay of Biscay, killing all 17 people on board, including film actor Leslie Howard.
 July 28 – American Airlines Flight 63, a Douglas DC-3 nicknamed the Flagship Ohio, crashes near Trammel, Kentucky, United States, after the crew loses control due to severe turbulence and violent downdrafts; 20 of the 22 people on board are killed.
 October 15 – American Airlines Flight 63, a Douglas DC-3 nicknamed the Flagship Missouri, crashes near Centerville, Tennessee, United States, after ice forms on its wings and propellers; all eight passengers and three crew members are killed.

1944 
 February 10 – American Airlines Flight 2, a Douglas DC-3, crashes into the Mississippi River between Arkansas and Tennessee, United States, for reasons unknown, killing all 24 occupants (21 passengers and three crew members).
 June 20 – TWA Flight 277, a Douglas C-54 Skymaster, crashes into Fort Mountain, Maine, United States, in severe weather, killing all seven passengers and crew on board.

1945 
 January 8 – The China Clipper, a Pan Am Martin M-130 flying boat operating an airmail service from Miami, Florida, United States, to Leopoldville in the Belgian Congo, crashes in Port of Spain, Trinidad, killing all 25 people on board.
 July 12 – Eastern Air Lines Flight 45, a Douglas DC-3A, collides with a Douglas A-26 Invader over Florence, South Carolina, United States; one of the 24 on board the DC-3 and two of the three on board the A-26 die.
 October 5 – National Airlines Flight 16, a Lockheed L-18 Lodestar operating a multi-leg domestic flight in Florida, United States, overshoots the runway after landing at the new municipal airport in south Lakeland, killing two of the 15 people on board.

1946 
 January 6 – Pennsylvania Central Airlines Flight 105, a Douglas DC-3, crashes in Birmingham, Alabama, United States, killing three of the four crew members; the flight attendant and all 16 passengers survive.
 March 10 – The 1946 Australian National Airways DC-3 crash near Hobart, Tasmania, kills all 25 on board.
 July 11 – TWA Flight 513, a Lockheed L-049 Constellation, crashes near Reading, Pennsylvania, United States, after a fire in the baggage compartment; of the six crew on board, only one survives.
 August 7 – British European Airways Flight 530, a Douglas C-47, crashes into Mistberget mountain near Eidsvoll, Norway; killing three of five crew; all 10 passengers survive.
 October 3 – An American Overseas Airlines Douglas DC-4 crashes into mountainous terrain after takeoff from Stephenville, Newfoundland, killing all 39 passengers and crew on board.
 November 14 – In the 1946 KLM Douglas DC-3 Amsterdam accident, a Douglas DC-3 crashes while attempting to land at Amsterdam Schiphol Airport in the Netherlands; all 26 passengers and crew on board are killed.
 December 19 – In the 1946 Railway Air Services Dakota crash, a Douglas DC-3 crashes shortly after taking off from Northolt Airport, England and comes to rest on top of a house. All five occupants survive the crash without injury.
 December 28 – TWA Flight 6963, a Lockheed L-049 Constellation, crashes near Shannon Airport due to an inaccurate altimeter caused by maintenance errors, killing nine of 23 on board.
 December 28 – American Airlines Flight 2207, a Douglas C-50, crashes near Michigan City, Indiana, United States following double engine failure caused by unexplained fuel starvation, killing both pilots; the remaining crew member and all 18 passengers survive.

1947 
 January 11 – In the 1947 BOAC Douglas C-47 crash, a BOAC Douglas C-47A crashes into Barley Hill near Stowting, Kent, United Kingdom, due to fuel starvation, killing eight of the 16 on board.
 January 12 – Eastern Air Lines Flight 665, a Douglas C-49, crashes into high ground near Galax, Virginia, after the pilot became disorientated, 17 people were killed in the crash, only one survived.
 January 25 – In the 1947 Croydon Dakota accident, a Spencer Airways Douglas C-47A fails to get airborne at Croydon Airport, United Kingdom, and crashes into a parked ČSA aircraft; 12 of the 22 on board are killed.
 January 26 – In the 1947 KLM Douglas DC-3 Copenhagen accident, a Douglas DC-3 crashes shortly after takeoff from Kastrup Airport in Denmark, killing all 22 passengers and crew on board.
 February 15 – An Avianca Douglas DC-4 crashes into Mount El Tabalazo due to pilot error, killing all 53 passengers and crew on board.
 May 29 – In the 1947 Héðinsfjörður air crash, a Flugfélag Islands Douglas DC-3 crashes into Hestfjall on the west side of Héðinsfjörður fjord, killing all 25 on board in Iceland's deadliest air disaster.
 May 29 – United Air Lines Flight 521, a Douglas DC-4, crashes on takeoff from LaGuardia Airport, New York, United States, due to pilot error; 42 of the 48 on board die.
 May 30 – Eastern Air Lines Flight 605, a Douglas DC-4, loses control and crashes near Bainbridge, Maryland, United States, killing all 53 passengers and crew on board in the deadliest airliner crash in US history at the time.
 June 13 – Pennsylvania Central Airlines Flight 410, a Douglas DC-4, crashes into Lookout Rock, in the West Virginia Blue Ridge Mountains of the United States en route from Pittsburgh to Washington DC; all 50 passengers and crew are killed.
 June 19 – Pan Am Flight 121, a Lockheed L-049 Constellation, crashes in the Syrian desert, en route from Karachi to Istanbul, killing 14 of the 36 on board.
 August 2 – In the 1947 BSAA Star Dust accident, an Avro Lancastrian airliner disappears over the Andes after transmitting an enigmatic coded message ("STENDEC"); the fate of the aircraft remains a mystery for more than 50 years until the crash site is finally located in 2000; it is apparent that all 11 people on board died in the accident.
 August 28 – In the Kvitbjørn disaster, a Norwegian Air Lines Short Sandringham flying boat strikes a mountain near Lødingsfjellet, Norway, killing all 35 on board.
 October 24 – United Air Lines Flight 608, a Douglas DC-6, crashes near Bryce Canyon Airport, Utah, United States when a fire caused by a design flaw destroys the aircraft; all 52 on board die in the first hull loss of the DC-6.
 October 26 – Pan Am Flight 923, a Douglas DC-4, crashes into Tamgas Mountain on Annette Island, Alaska, killing all 18 passengers and crew on board; the cause of the accident is never determined.
 December 27 – In the 1947 Korangi Creek crash, an Air India Douglas C-48 crashes shortly after takeoff, killing all 23 on board.

1948 
 January 28 – In the 1948 Los Gatos DC-3 crash, an Airline Transport Carriers Douglas DC-3 crashes in the Diablo Range, California, after an engine fire; all 32 passengers and crew are killed.
 January 30 – In the BSAA Star Tiger disappearance, an Avro Tudor IV disappears without a trace en route from the Azores to Bermuda with 31 on board; the loss of the aircraft remains an unsolved mystery to this day, with the resulting speculation contributing to the Bermuda Triangle legend.
 March 2 – In the 1948 Heathrow disaster, a Sabena DC-3 crashes at Heathrow Airport in poor visibility due to pilot error, killing 20 of 22 on board.
 March 12 – Northwest Airlines Flight 4422, a Douglas C-54 Skymaster, crashes into Mount Sanford in the Alaska Territory, killing 30; although found, the wreckage is initially inaccessible and is not rediscovered until 1999 after being buried for more than 50 years.
 April 5 – In the 1948 Gatow air disaster, a British European Airways Vickers VC.1 Viking crashes near RAF Gatow, Berlin, following a collision with a Soviet Air Force Yakovlev Yak-3 fighter; all 14 people on board the Viking are killed, as well as the Soviet pilot.
 April 15 – Pan Am Flight 1-10, a Lockheed Constellation, crashes while on approach to Shannon Airport, Ireland; of the 31 people on board, only one survives.
 April 21 – British European Airways Flight S200P, a Vickers VC.1 Viking, crashes into Irish Law Mountain in Scotland due to pilot error; all on board survive.
 May 12 – In the 1948 Sabena Douglas DC-4 crash, a Douglas DC-4 crashes near Libenge, Belgian Congo (now Democratic Republic of the Congo) after flying into a tornado, killing 31 of 32 on board.
 June 17 – United Air Lines Flight 624, a Douglas DC-6, crashes near Mount Carmel, Pennsylvania, after failed attempts to extinguish what was believed to have been an onboard fire; all 39 passengers and four crew are killed.
 July 4 – The 1948 Northwood mid-air collision, between a Scandinavian Airlines System-operated Douglas DC-6 and an RAF Avro York, kills all 39 passengers and crew on board both aircraft.
 July 17 – Miss Macao, a Catalina seaplane en route from Macau to Hong Kong in southern China, is hijacked over the Pearl River delta by a group attempting to rob the passengers; following a struggle in the cockpit, a crash kills all but one of the 26 people on board (the sole survivor is later identified as the lead hijacker); this is the earliest known airliner hijacking.
 August 1 – Air France Flight 072, a Latécoère 631, disappears over the Atlantic Ocean with the loss of all 52 people on board. This was the worst aviation accident in the Atlantic Ocean at the time and remains the worst ever involving the Latécoère 631.
 August 29 – Northwest Airlines Flight 421, a Martin 2-0-2, crashes near Winona, Minnesota, due to structural failure of a wing, killing all 37 on board in the worst ever accident involving the Martin 2-0-2. This crash is also the first loss of a 2-0-2.
 September 2 – In the 1948 Lutana crash, Australian National Airways Flight 331, a Douglas DC-3, crashes into high terrain near Nundle, New South Wales, killing all 13 people on board.
 October 2 – In the Bukken Bruse disaster, a Norwegian Air Lines Short Sandringham flying boat crashes upon landing in Trondheim, Norway, killing 19 of the 43 people on board; Bertrand Russell is among the 24 survivors.
 October 12 – An Aeroflot Ilyushin Il-12 disappears over the Caucasus Mountains near Yevlakh, Azerbaijan with ten on board.
 October 20 – In the 1948 KLM Constellation air disaster, a Lockheed Constellation named Nijmegen, flying from Schiphol Airport, Netherlands, to New York City, United States, crashes near Prestwick, Scotland, killing all 40 on board.
 December 28 – In the 1948 Airborne Transport DC-3 (DST) disappearance, a Douglas DC-3 flying from San Juan, Puerto Rico to Miami, Florida, disappears without a trace off the coast of Florida with 32 on board.

1949 
 January 17 – In the BSAA Star Ariel disappearance, an Avro Tudor IV disappears without a trace en route from Bermuda to Jamaica with 20 on board; the loss of the aircraft remains an unsolved mystery to this day, with the resulting speculation contributing to the Bermuda Triangle legend.
 February 19 – A British European Airways Douglas Dakota collides with a RAF Avro Anson over Exhall, Warwickshire, killing all 14 on board both aircraft.
 March 10 – A Queensland Airlines Lockheed Lodestar crashes on takeoff from Coolangatta airstrip, killing all 21 on board.
 May 4 – In the Superga air disaster, an Italian Airlines Fiat G.212 CP carrying the Torino football team crashes into the Superga hills near Turin, killing all 31 on board.
 June 7 – In the 1949 Strato-Freight Curtiss C-46A crash, a Curtiss Wright C-46A-50 Modified D, crashes into the Atlantic Ocean shortly after takeoff from San Juan, Puerto Rico. Of the 81 passengers and crew on board, 53 are killed.
 July 2 – A MacRobertson Miller Airlines Douglas DC-3 crashes on takeoff from Perth, Western Australia, killing all 18 on board.
 July 12 – Standard Air Lines Flight 897R, a Curtiss C-46, crashes at Chatsworth, California, due to pilot error, killing 35 of 48 on board.
 August 19 – A British European Airways Douglas DC-3 crashes into a hillside near Oldham, United Kingdom; of the 32 on board, only eight survive.
 September 9 – Canadian Pacific Air Lines Flight 108, a Douglas DC-3, explodes over Cap Tourmente near Sault-au-Cochon, Quebec, due to a bomb planted by Albert Guay; all four crew members and 19 passengers on board are killed.
 September 26 – A Mexicana de Aviacion DC-3 crashes into Popocatepetl volcano, killing all 23 on board.
 October 28 – Air France Flight 009, a Lockheed Constellation crashes into a mountain on São Miguel Island, Azores, Portugal, killing all 48 people on board, including boxer Marcel Cerdan and violinist Ginette Neveu.
 November 1 – Eastern Air Lines Flight 537, a Douglas DC-4, on approach to Washington National Airport, suffers a mid-air collision with a Lockheed P-38; all 55 people on board the DC-4 die, including Congressman George J. Bates, New Yorker cartoonist Helen E. Hokinson, and former Congressman Michael J. Kennedy; the pilot and sole occupant of the P-38 is seriously injured.
 November 20 – In the Hurum air disaster, an Aero Holland Douglas DC-3 crashes near Hurum, Norway, killing 34 of the 35 on board, including 25 children.
 November 29 – American Airlines Flight 157, a Douglas DC-6, en route from New York City to Mexico City with 46 passengers and crew, veers off the runway and strikes buildings after the flight crew loses control on final approach to Dallas Love Field; 26 passengers and two flight attendants die.
 December 18 – A Sabena Douglas DC-3 crashes after suffering a structural failure of a wing, killing all eight on board.

1950s

1950 
 January 5 – In the 1950 Sverdlovsk air disaster, a Lisunov Li-2 crashes near Sverdlovsk (now Yekaterinburg), Soviet Union,  killing all 19 on board.
 March 7 – Northwest Orient Airlines Flight 307, a Martin 2-0-2, crashes near Minneapolis–Saint Paul International Airport, after hitting a flagpole during approach, killing all 13 on board and two on the ground.
 March 12 – The Llandow air disaster: An Airflight Avro 689 Tudor V stalls and crashes after the rear cargo hold was overloaded, resulting in a center of gravity exceeding the aft limit; 80 out of the 83 people on board die, at the time the worst air disaster in history.
 1950 Air France multiple Douglas DC-4 accidents:
 June 12 – An Air France Douglas DC-4 (F-BBDE) on a flight from Saigon to Paris crashes in the Arabian Sea while on approach to Bahrain Airport, killing 46 of 52 on board.
 June 14 – An Air France Douglas DC-4, F-BBDM, crashes in the Arabian Sea while on approach to Bahrain Airport, killing 40 of 53 on board. This aircraft was operating on the same flight route as F-BBDE.
 June 24 – Northwest Orient Airlines Flight 2501, a Douglas DC-4, with 58 people on board, disappears without a trace over Lake Michigan.
 June 26 – Australian National Airways Amana, a Douglas DC-4, crashes after takeoff from Perth Airport, killing all 29 people on board.
 August 31 – TWA Flight 903, a Lockheed L-749A Constellation, crashes because of an engine fire, in the desert about  NNW of Cairo, Egypt; all 55 on board are killed in the worst ever accident involving the Lockheed L-749.
 October 31 – A British European Airways Vickers VC.1 Viking crashes on the runway at London Heathrow Airport in foggy weather; of the 30 on board, only a stewardess and a passenger survive.
 November 3 – Air India Flight 245, a Lockheed L-749A Constellation, crashes into Mont Blanc in France; all 40 passengers and eight crew are killed. Sixteen years later, Air India Flight 101 crashes in almost exactly the same spot.
 November 13 – In the 1950 Tête de l'Obiou C-54 crash, a Douglas C-54 Skymaster operated by Curtiss Reid Flying Services crashes  from Grenoble, France, on the Tête de l'Obiou mountain; all 52 passengers and crew die.

1951 
 January 14 – National Airlines Flight 83, a Douglas DC-4, crashes on landing at Philadelphia International Airport, Pennsylvania. Seven of the 28 passengers and crew are killed, one of them being heroine flight attendant Frankie Housley who died trying to save more passengers.
 March 27 – In the 1951 Ringway Dakota crash, an Air Transport Charter Douglas DC-3 crashes shortly after taking off from Manchester-Ringway Airport, England. Two of the three crew members are killed.
 April 25 – Cubana de Aviación Flight 493, a Douglas DC-4 en route from Miami to Havana, collides in mid-air with a United States Navy Beech SNB-1 Kansan off Key West; all 43 aboard both aircraft are killed.
 June 22 – Pan Am Flight 151, a Lockheed L-049 Constellation en route from Accra, Ghana to Monrovia, Liberia, crashes into a hill near Sanoye in Bong County, Liberia, 54 miles (86 km) from the airport; all 31 passengers and six crew members die.
 June 30 – United Air Lines Flight 610, a Douglas DC-6, flies into a mountain in Larimer County, Colorado, due to a navigational error; all 45 passengers and five crew members are killed.
 July 21 – Canadian Pacific Air Lines Flight 3505, a Douglas DC-4, disappears on a flight from Vancouver, British Columbia, Canada, to Tokyo, Japan; all 37 on board are presumed dead; the aircraft has never been found.
 August 24 – United Air Lines Flight 615, a Douglas DC-6B, crashes near Decoto (now Union City, California), while on final approach to Oakland, California; all 44 passengers and six crew members die.
 November 15 – A LOT Polish Airlines Lisunov Li-2 crashes near Tuszyn shortly after takeoff due to engine failure, killing all 16 passengers and crew on board.
 December 16 – A Miami Airlines Curtiss C-46 Commando crashes at Elizabeth, New Jersey, after a loss of control following an engine fire, killing all 56 passengers and crew on board.
 December 22 – A Misrair SNCASE Languedoc crashes west of Tehran in a snowstorm, killing all 20 people on board.
 December 29 – Continental Charters Flight 44-2, a Curtiss-Wright C-46, crashes into a ridge near Napoli, New York, while en route to Buffalo, New York; three crew members and 23 passengers die.

1952 
 January 22 – American Airlines Flight 6780, a Convair CV-240, crashes on approach to Newark, New Jersey, into dwellings in Elizabeth, New Jersey, killing 30 and leading to the Doolittle Commission recommendation for laws coordinating urban zoning to keep airport approach paths clear.
 February 11 – National Airlines Flight 101, a Douglas DC-6 crashes into an apartment building in Elizabeth, New Jersey, two minutes after departing Newark Airport, killing 33 people (including four residents of the building).
 March 3 – An Air France SNCASE Languedoc crashes on takeoff from Nice, France, due to jammed controls. All 38 people on board are killed.
 March 22 – KLM Flight 592, a Douglas DC-6, crashes on approach to Ciampino Airport for reasons unknown, killing 45 of 47 on board.
 April 9 – Japan Air Lines Flight 301, a Martin 2-0-2 leased from Northwest Airlines and named Mokusei, strikes the side of Mount Mihara, killing all 37 on board; the cause was not determined, but a navigation error was blamed.
 April 28 – Pan Am Flight 202, a Boeing 377 Stratocruiser, crashes after a propeller failure in a remote area of Brazil on its way from Buenos Aires, Argentina, to New York City via Rio de Janeiro; all 50 on board are killed in the deadliest accident involving the Boeing 377.
 June 28 – American Airlines Flight 910, a Douglas DC-6 carrying 55 passengers and five crew collides with a Temco Swift private plane on final approach to Dallas Love Field, killing both occupants of the Swift; the DC-6 lands safely with no injuries to the passengers or crew.
 August 12 – A Transportes Aéreos Nacional Douglas C-47A explodes in mid-air on a domestic flight in Brazil; all 24 on board die.
 December 6 – A Cubana de Aviación Douglas DC-4 crashes into the Atlantic Ocean off Bermuda after failing to gain altitude after takeoff, killing 37 of 41 on board.

1953 
 January 5 – In the 1953 Nutts Corner Viking accident, a British European Airways Vickers Viking crashes on approach to Belfast-Nutts Corner Airport, killing 27 of the 31 on board.
 February 2 – In the 1953 Skyways Avro York disappearance, a plane with 39 on board disappears over the North Atlantic.
 February 14 – National Airlines Flight 470, a Douglas DC-6 en route from Tampa, Florida to New Orleans, Louisiana crashes into the Gulf of Mexico after encountering severe turbulence. All 46 passengers and crew are killed.
 May 2 – BOAC Flight 783, a de Havilland Comet, breaks up in mid-air and crashes near Calcutta, India after flying into a thunderstorm; all 43 on board die.
 July 12 – Transocean Air Lines Flight 512, a Douglas DC-6A, crashes in the Pacific Ocean while en route from Wake Island to Honolulu, Hawaii. All 58 passengers and crew are killed.
 August 3 – Air France Flight 152, a Lockheed L-749A Constellation ditches into the Mediterranean Sea while en route from Rome to Beirut after an engine separated. Four elderly passengers drowned.
 September 1 – Air France Flight 178, a Lockheed Constellation, crashes into a mountain in southern France; all 42 on board are killed.
 September 16 – American Airlines Flight 723, a Convair 240, crashes while on approach to Albany Airport; all 28 passengers and crew die.
 October 14 – A Sabena Convair 240 loses control and crashes shortly after takeoff from Frankfurt Airport following double engine failure, killing all 44 on board.
 October 29 – BCPA Flight 304, a Douglas DC-6B, crashes into King's Mountain, southeast of Half Moon Bay, California, on its approach to San Francisco International Airport, killing all 11 on board.

1954 
 January 10 – BOAC Flight 781, a de Havilland Comet flying from Rome to London on the last leg of a flight from Singapore, disintegrates in mid-air, when metal fatigue from repeated pressurization cycles compromises the fuselage, killing the 29 passengers and six crew.
 March 13 – A BOAC Lockheed L-749A Constellation crashes as it attempts to land at Kallang Airport, Singapore; of the 40 passengers and crew on board, 33 are killed.
 April 8 – South African Airways Flight 201, a de Havilland Comet flying from Rome to Cairo bound for Johannesburg, disintegrates in mid-air, killing all 14 passengers and seven crew; as in BOAC Flight 781, the cause is metal fatigue at stress risers at the corners of the square windows in the aluminium skin.
 April 8 – Trans-Canada Air Lines Flight 9, a Canadair C-4 North Star, collides with a RCAF Harvard over Moose Jaw, Canada, killing all 37 on both aircraft.
 June 19 – In the 1954 Swissair Convair CV-240 crash, a Convair CV-240 ditches into the English Channel after running out of fuel. All survive the ditching, but three of the passengers drown due to a lack of lifejackets.
 July 23 – The 1954 Cathay Pacific Douglas DC-4 shootdown: a Cathay Pacific Douglas DC-4 is attacked by two PLAAF La-7 fighters and crashes off Hainan Island, killing 10 of 19 on board.
 August 23 – KLM Flight 608, a Douglas DC-6, crashes into the North Sea for reasons unknown, killing all 12 passengers and nine crew members on board.
 September 5 – KLM Flight 633, a Lockheed L-1049 Super Constellation, ditches after takeoff from Shannon Airport in Ireland, killing 28 of 56 on board.
 December 25 – In the 1954 Prestwick air disaster a British Overseas Airways Corporation Boeing 377 Stratocruiser crashes on landing at Prestwick Airport, Scotland, killing 28 of the 36 on board.

1955 
 January 12 – TWA Flight 694, a Martin 2-0-2, collides with a privately owned Douglas DC-3 over Cincinnati, Ohio, killing all 15 on board both aircraft.
 February 13 – Sabena Flight 503, a Douglas DC-6B, crashes into Monte Terminillo, Italy in poor weather, killing all 29 on board.
 February 19 – TWA Flight 260, a Martin 4-0-4, crashes into the Sandia Mountains near Albuquerque, New Mexico, killing all 16 on board.
 March 20 – American Airlines Flight 711, a Convair CV-240 crashes into a field on approach into Springfield-Branson Regional Airport, Missouri. 13 of the 35 passengers and crew are killed.
 March 26 – Pan Am Flight 845/26, a Boeing 377 Stratocruiser, ditches in the Pacific Ocean off the Oregon coast, killing four of the 23 on board.
 April 4 – A United Air Lines Douglas DC-6 crashes after takeoff from Long Island MacArthur Airport, killing all three on board.
 April 11 – Air India Flight 300, a Lockheed L-749 Constellation named Kashmir Princess, explodes under suspicious circumstances; 16 people are killed and three survive.
 July 27 – El Al Flight 402, a Lockheed L-049 Constellation, inadvertently strays over Bulgarian territory on its way from Vienna to Tel Aviv, and is shot down by two Bulgarian fighter aircraft, killing all 58 on board.
 October 6 – United Air Lines Flight 409, a Douglas DC-4, crashes into Medicine Bow Peak near Centennial, Wyoming, killing all 66 on board.
 November 1 – United Air Lines Flight 629, a Douglas DC-6B, is bombed by Jack Gilbert Graham over Longmont, Colorado; all 44 on board are killed.

1956 
 February 18 – In the Żurrieq Scottish Airlines crash, a Scottish Airlines Avro York crashes near Żurrieq, Malta due to pilot error, killing all 50 on board.
 April 1 – TWA Flight 400, a Martin 4-0-4, crashes on takeoff at Greater Pittsburgh International Airport, killing 22 of the 36 on board; 14 survive.
 April 2 – Northwest Orient Airlines Flight 2, a Boeing 377 Stratocruiser, ditches into Puget Sound after takeoff from Seattle–Tacoma International Airport after the cowl flaps are incorrectly set for takeoff; four passengers and a flight attendant die.
 June 20 – Linea Aeropostal Flight 253, a Lockheed L-1049 Constellation, crashes into the Atlantic Ocean off Asbury Park, New Jersey. All 74 passengers and crew on board are killed.
 June 24 – In the 1956 Kano Airport BOAC Argonaut crash, a Canadair C-4 Argonaut crashes shortly after taking off from Kano Airport, Nigeria, into a thunderstorm, killing 32 of the 38 passengers and three of the seven crew.
 June 30 – The 1956 Grand Canyon mid-air collision between United Airlines Flight 718, a DC-7 and TWA Flight 2, a Lockheed Constellation, over the Grand Canyon, kills all 128 aboard both aircraft; operating under Visual Flight Rules, the planes fail to see each other and collide; the Federal Aviation Administration is created in the aftermath.
 July 9 – Trans-Canada Air Lines Flight 304, a Vickers Viscount, sheds a propeller blade over Flat Rock, Michigan; the blade penetrates the passenger cabin, killing one of 35 aboard; this is the first known case of a turboprop shedding a blade in passenger service.
 October 16 – Pan Am Flight 6, a Boeing 377 Stratocruiser, is forced to ditch in the Pacific Ocean between Hawai'i and San Francisco; all 31 on board are rescued by a nearby United States Coast Guard ship.
 November 7 – Braathens SAFE Flight 253, a de Havilland Heron, crashes into Hummelfjell mountain near Tolga, Norway, killing two of 12 on board.
 November 27 – Linea Aeropostal Flight 253, a Lockheed L-749 Constellation, crashes while on approach to Caracas International Airport, killing all 25 on board.
 December 9 – Trans-Canada Air Lines Flight 810, a Canadair North Star, crashes near Hope, British Columbia, Canada, killing all 62 people on board; the wreckage is located several months later. Aboard are four members of the Canadian Football League Saskatchewan Roughriders, and former Iowa Hawkeye Outland Trophy winner Cal Jones.

1957 
 February 1 – Northeast Airlines Flight 823, a Douglas DC-6, crashes during a snowstorm shortly after takeoff from LaGuardia Airport; 20 of the 101 occupants die.
 March 14 – British European Airways Flight 411, a Vickers Viscount, crashes while on approach to Manchester Airport, killing all 20 on board and two on the ground.
 May 1 – In the 1957 Blackbushe Viking accident, an Eagle Aviation Vickers VC.1 Viking crashes after engine failure at Blackbushe Airport; of the 35 on board, only a passenger survives.
 July 16 – KLM Flight 844, a Lockheed Super Constellation, crashes after takeoff from Biak-Mokmer Airport, Indonesia, killing 58 of 68 on board.
 August 11 – Maritime Central Airways Flight 315, a Douglas DC-4, crashes near Issoudun, Quebec after encountering turbulence in a thunderstorm, killing all 79 passengers and crew on board.
 September 15 – Northeast Airlines Flight 285, a Douglas DC-3, crashes on approach to New Bedford Regional Airport following a premature descent due to pilot error, killing 12 of 24 on board.
 November 8 – Pan Am Flight 7, a Boeing 377 Stratocruiser, disappears between San Francisco and Honolulu; small pieces of wreckage and human remains are found almost a week later by the United States Navy; all 44 on board are believed to have been killed.
 November 15 – In the 1957 Aquila Airways Solent crash, a flying boat crashes near Chessell, Isle of Wight, UK, due to engine failure, killing 45 out of the 58 on board.

1958 
 February 6 – In the Munich air disaster, a British European Airways Airspeed Ambassador operating as Flight 609 crashes while attempting a take off in a snowstorm from Munich-Riem Airport, killing 23 of 44 passenger and crew members on board including eight Manchester United footballers.
 February 27 – In the Winter Hill air disaster, a Silver City Airways Bristol 170 Freighter traveling from the Isle of Man to Manchester Ringway Airport crashes into Winter Hill, Lancashire, killing 35 people and injuring seven.
 April 6 – Capital Airlines Flight 67, a Vickers 745D Viscount, crashes at Tri-City Airport (now MBS International Airport) near Freeland, Michigan, killing all 47 passengers and crew; an undiscovered ice buildup on the wing and windy conditions are possible causes.
 April 21 – United Airlines Flight 736, a Douglas DC-7, collides near Las Vegas, Nevada, with a US Air Force F-100 Super Sabre fighter on a training mission. All 47 aboard the airliner and both F-100 crew members are killed.
 May 20 – Capital Airlines Flight 300, a Vickers Viscount, and an USAF T-33 jet trainer collide in midair and crash. Of the 13 people on both aircraft only 1 pilot of the jet survives.
 May 25 – An Avro York 685 cargo aircraft crashes during a forced landing after an engine catches fire en route from Karachi to Delhi, killing four of the five people on board.
 August 9 – Central African Airways Flight 890, a Vickers Viscount, crashes due to pilot error near Benina International Airport, Libya.  Of the 54 on board, 36 are killed.
 August 14 – KLM Flight 607-E, a Lockheed L-1049 Super Constellation (named Hugo de Groot) en route from Amsterdam to New York, crashes into the Atlantic Ocean shortly after takeoff from Shannon Airport in Ireland, killing all 99 passengers and crew, including six members of the Egyptian fencing team.
 August 15 – Aeroflot Flight 4, a Tupolev Tu-104, crashes after stalling in an updraft, killing all 64 people on board.
 August 15 – Northeast Airlines Flight 258, a Convair 240, crashes near Nantucket International Airport due to pilot error, killing 25 of 34 on board.
 September 2 – An Independent Air Travel Vickers VC.1 Viking crashes near Southall, Middlesex, killing all three crew on board and another four people on the ground.
 October 17 – An Aeroflot Tupolev Tu-104 crashes near Kanash, Russia due to a loss of control after encountering severe turbulence, killing all 80 on board.
 October 22 – British European Airways Flight 142, a Vickers Viscount, collides with an Italian Air Force North American F-86 Sabre over Italy, all 31 on board die.
 December 4 – An Aviaco SNCASE Languedoc crashes in the Guadarrama Mountains, killing all 21 people on board.
 December 24 – A BOAC Bristol Britannia crashes near Christchurch, Dorset, England, killing nine of 12 on board.

1959 
 January 8 – Southeast Airlines Flight 308, a Douglas DC-3A, crashes into the Holston Mountain range, Tennessee, on approach to the Tri-Cities Regional Airport, killing all 10 people on board.
 January 11 – Lufthansa Flight 502, a Lockheed L-1049 Super Constellation, crashes on approach to Rio de Janeiro–Galeão International Airport, Brazil, 36 of the 39 on board are killed.
 January 16 – Austral Líneas Aéreas Flight 205, a Curtiss C-46 Commando, crashes after a missed approach to Mar Del Plata Airport in Argentina, killing 51 of the 52 people on board.
 February 3 – American Airlines Flight 320, a Lockheed L-188 Super Electra, crashes into the East River, New York City, as a result of pilot error; 65 passengers and crew are killed.
 February 3 – Pan Am Flight 115, a Boeing 707 with 119 people on board experiences an unplanned emergency descent from 35,000 ft to 6,000 ft. The crew manage to regain control and make an emergency landing in Gander, Canada.
 February 17 – In the 1959 Turkish Airlines Gatwick crash, a chartered Vickers Viscount 793 carrying the Turkish prime minister and other government officials crashes in heavy fog during its final approach into London Gatwick Airport; five of the eight crew and nine of the 16 passengers die in the accident; Prime Minister Adnan Menderes is among the 10 survivors.
 April 23 – In the 1959 Air Charter Turkey crash, an Avro Super Trader IV crashes on Mount Süphan, Turkey; all 12 crew on board die.
 May 12 – Capital Airlines Flight 75, a Vickers Viscount 745D flying from New York City to Atlanta, breaks up in flight over Chase, Maryland, due to loss of control in severe turbulence; all 31 on board are killed.
 June 26 – TWA Flight 891, a Lockheed Starliner, is struck by lightning shortly after takeoff from Milan Malpensa Airport and crashes near Marnate; all 68 passengers and crew on board are killed.
 August 15 – American Airlines Flight 514, a Boeing 707 crashes near Calverton-Peconic River Airport, New York after a loss of control. All five crew members are killed in the first crash involving a Boeing 707.
 August 19 – A Transair Douglas Dakota crashes into a mountain in Spain, killing all 32 on board.
 September 24 – TAI Flight 307, a Douglas DC-7, crashes into a pine forest on departure from Mérignac Airport, France; 54 of the 65 people on board are killed.
 September 29 – Braniff Flight 542, a Lockheed L-188 Electra, breaks up in mid-air and crashes  from Buffalo, Texas; all 34 on board die.
 October 30 – Piedmont Airlines Flight 349, a Douglas DC-3, crashes on Bucks Elbow Mountain near Charlottesville, Virginia, killing the crew of three and 23 of 24 passengers; the sole survivor is seriously injured; the cause is a navigational error during an Instrument Landing System approach.
 November 16 – National Airlines Flight 967, a Douglas DC-7B, explodes in mid-air and crashes into the Gulf of Mexico while on a flight from Tampa, Florida, to New Orleans, Louisiana; all 40 on board die.
 November 16 – Aeroflot Flight 315, an Antonov An-10, enters a nosedive and crashes on approach to Lviv Airport due to tail icing, killing all 40 on board.
 November 21 – Ariana Afghan Airlines Flight 202, a Douglas DC-4, crashes into a hillside near Beirut shortly after takeoff, killing 24 of 27 on board.
 December 1 – Allegheny Airlines Flight 371, a Martin 2-0-2 crashes on approach into Williamsport Regional Airport, Pennsylvania. Only one passenger survives out of the 26 passengers and crew on board.
 December 13 – Aeroflot Flight 120, an Ilyushin Il-14, crashes in the Baysuntau mountain range, Uzbekistan, after the pilot deviates from the flight route; all 30 on board die.

1960s

1960 
 January 6 – National Airlines Flight 2511, a Douglas DC-6B bound from New York to Miami, crashes near Bolivia, North Carolina, when a bomb planted on board explodes in mid-air; all 34 people on board are killed.
 January 18 – Capital Airlines Flight 20, a Vickers Viscount, en route from Washington National Airport to Norfolk International Airport crashes near Holdcroft, Virginia due to engine failure caused by icy conditions; all 50 on board are killed.
 January 19 – Scandinavian Airlines System Flight 871, a Sud Aviation Caravelle, crashes while on approach to Esenboğa Airport, Ankara, Turkey, killing all 42 on board; an undetermined descent was to blame for the first fatal crash of the Sud Caravelle.
 January 21 – Avianca Flight 671, a Lockheed Constellation, crashes on landing at Sangster International Airport, Jamaica, killing two of the seven crew and 35 of 39 passengers on board in Jamaica's worst aviation accident.
 February 25 – The 1960 Rio de Janeiro mid-air collision: A United States Navy Douglas R6D-1 (DC-6A) collides with Real Transportes Aéreos Flight 753, a Douglas DC-3, over Rio de Janeiro, Brazil; of the 38 occupants of the American aircraft, three survive, and all 26 passengers and crew of the Brazilian aircraft are killed.
 February 26 – Aeroflot Flight 315, an Antonov An-10A, crashes short of the runway at Lviv Airport due to tail icing; of the 33 on board, only a passenger survives.
 February 26 – Alitalia Flight 618, a Douglas DC-7C, crashes shortly after takeoff from Shannon Airport for reasons unknown, killing 34 of 52 on board.
 June 10 – Trans Australia Airlines Flight 538, a Fokker F-27, crashes into the ocean near Mackay, Queensland, Australia, killing all 29 on board in Australia's worst civilian air disaster. This crash was responsible for the mandatory installation of cockpit voice recorders in airliners in Australia, followed by the rest of the world.
 June 10 – Aeroflot Flight 207, an Ilyushin Il-14, crashes into a mountain near Tkvarcheli, Georgia after the crew deviated from the flight route; all 31 on board die.
 July 15 – Ethiopian Airlines Flight 372, a Douglas C-47 Skytrain, crashes into a mountain near Jimma, Ethiopia due to pilot error, killing one of the pilots.
 August 17 – Aeroflot Flight 36, an Ilyushin Il-18, crashes near Tarasovich, Ukraine following an engine fire, killing all 34 on board.
 September 26 – Austrian Airlines Flight 901, a Vickers Viscount, crashes short of runway 07 at Sheremetyevo International Airport. 31 of the 37 passengers and crew on board are killed.
 October 4 – Eastern Air Lines Flight 375, a Lockheed L-188 Super Electra, crashes on takeoff from Boston's Logan International Airport into Winthrop Bay, after multiple bird strikes; 62 of 72 aboard die.
 October 29 – The Cal Poly football team plane crash: a chartered Curtiss C-46 crashes on takeoff at the Toledo Express Airport in Toledo, Ohio, with the loss of 22 people including 16 players on the California Polytechnic State University football team.
 November 23 – Philippine Airlines Flight S26, a Douglas DC-3C, strikes the slope of Mount Baco due to a possible navigation error; all 33 on board die.
 December 16 – The 1960 New York mid-air collision: United Airlines Flight 826, a Douglas DC-8, and TWA Flight 266, a Lockheed Super Constellation, collide in mid-air over Staten Island in New York; all 128 aboard the two planes and six people on the ground are killed. This is the first crash in which a flight recorder was used to provide details in a crash investigation. The accident was the deadliest aviation disaster in history at the time.

1961 
 January 3 – Aero Flight 311, a Douglas DC-3, crashes into woods near Koivulahti, Finland, killing all 25 on board.
 January 28 – American Airlines Flight 1502, a Boeing 707, crashes into the sea off Montauk Point, New York during a training flight following a loss of control. All six crew members on board are killed.
 February 15 – Sabena Flight 548, a Boeing 707, crashes on approach in Brussels, Belgium, killing 73, including the entire United States figure skating team: a runaway stabilizer is thought to have been the cause of the first fatal accident involving a 707 in regular passenger service.
 March 16 – Aeroflot Flight 68, a Tupolev Tu-104, crashes shortly after takeoff from Koltsovo Airport following engine failure, killing five of 51 on board; two people on the ground also die when the aircraft hits a house.
 March 28 – ČSA Flight 511, an Ilyushin Il-18, breaks up and crashes at Gräfenberg, West Germany. All 52 passengers and crew on board are killed.
 April 3 – LAN Chile Flight 621, a Douglas DC-3, crashes in the Andes, killing all 24 on board including footballers and coaching staff from the CD Green Cross Chilean football team.
 May 10 – Air France Flight 406, a Lockheed Starliner, crashes into the Sahara Desert near the Edjele oilfield in Algeria after a bomb goes off on board. All 78 passengers and crew are killed in the crash.
 May 30 – Viasa Flight 897, a Douglas DC-8, crashes shortly after taking off from Lisbon Portela Airport. All 61 passengers and crew on board are killed.
 June 12 – KLM Flight 823, a Lockheed L-188 Electra, crashes while on approach to Cairo International Airport due to pilot error; 20 of 36 on board die.
 July 11 – United Airlines Flight 859, a Douglas DC-8, crashes on landing at Stapleton International Airport, killing 17 passengers and one person on the ground.
 July 12 – ČSA Flight 511, an Ilyushin Il-18, crashes at Anfa Airport, Morocco for reasons unknown, killing all 72 on board.
 July 19 – Aerolíneas Argentinas Flight 644, a Douglas DC-6, breaks up and crashes 12 miles west of Pardo, Buenos Aires, Argentina after encountering severe turbulence shortly after takeoff. All 67 passengers and crew on board are killed.
 July 21 – Alaska Airlines Flight 779, a Douglas DC-6A on a military contract flight crashes short of the runway at Shemya Air Force Base, Alaska. All six crew members are killed.
 August 6 – In the 1961 Malév Hungarian Airlines Douglas C-47 Skytrain crash, a Malév Douglas C-47 crashes into an apartment building in Zugló, Budapest during a sightseeing flight due to pilot error, killing all 27 on board and three more on the ground; all in the apartment survived.
 August 9 – The Holtaheia Accident: An Eagle Airways Vickers VC.1 Viking crashes at Holta, Strand, Norway, killing all 39 on board, including 36 people from the Archbishop Lanfranc School.
 September 1 – TWA Flight 529, a Lockheed Constellation L-049 propliner, abruptly pitches up and crashes shortly after takeoff from Chicago's Midway Airport, killing all 73 passengers and five crew on board; a 5/16 inch bolt that fell out of the elevator control linkage just before the crash is blamed.
 September 11 – A President Airlines Douglas DC-6 crashes shortly after takeoff from Shannon Airport en route to Gander due to loss of control caused by possible pilot error, killing all 83 passengers and crew on board. The crash remains the worst in Irish territory.
 September 12 – Air France Flight 2005, a Sud Aviation Caravelle, crashes on approach to Rabat–Salé Airport due to misread instruments, killing all 77 on board.
 September 17 – Northwest Orient Airlines Flight 706, a Lockheed L-188 Electra, crashes on takeoff from Chicago as a result of a maintenance error causing the ailerons to become detached from the control wheels; all 37 on board die.
 September 18 – 1961 Ndola United Nations DC-6 Crash, a Douglas DC-6B, carrying Dag Hammarskjöld, second Secretary-General of the United Nations, crashes near Ndola, killing all 16 on board.
 September 23 – Turkish Airlines Flight 835, a Fokker F27 Friendship crashes while on approach to Esenboğa Airport; 28 of the 29 passengers and crew on board die in the crash.
 October 7 – In the 1961 Derby Aviation crash, a Douglas Dakota, crashes into Canigou mountainside en route to Perpignan from London due to a navigation error, killing all 34 aboard.
 November 8 – Imperial Airlines Flight 201/8, a Lockheed Constellation L-049, crashes on landing at Byrd Field near Richmond, Virginia; all 74 passengers—mostly new US Army recruits being flown to their base for training—die of carbon monoxide asphyxiation, along with three crew members; the captain and flight engineer survive by escaping the burning wreckage.
 November 23 – Aerolíneas Argentinas Flight 322, a de Havilland Comet, crashes in Campinas, Brazil, shortly after takeoff, killing all 12 crew and 40 passengers on board.
 November 30 – Ansett-ANA Flight 325, a Vickers Viscount, crashes into Botany Bay, Australia, 9 minutes after takeoff, killing all 15 people on board.
 December 17 – Aeroflot Flight 245, an Ilyushin Il-18, enters a nosedive and crashes near Chebotovka, Russia, after the pilot deployed the flaps by mistake, killing all 59 on board.

1962 
 February 25 – An Avensa Fairchild F-27 crashes into San Juan mountain on Margarita Island in the Caribbean Sea, killing all 23 on board.
 March 1 – American Airlines Flight 1, a Boeing 707 destined for Los Angeles, California, United States, crashes in Jamaica Bay, Queens, New York, due to a rudder malfunction; all 95 passengers and crew on board are killed.
 March 4 – Caledonian Airways Flight 153, a Douglas DC-7 operating a non-scheduled multi-leg flight out of Luxembourg, crashes into a jungle swamp at Douala, Cameroon for reasons unknown, killing all 111 on board.
 March 8 – A Turkish Airlines Fairchild F-27 crashes into the Bolkar Mountains while on approach to Turkey's Adana Airport, killing all 11 on board.
 March 16 – Flying Tiger Line Flight 739, a Lockheed L-1049 Super Constellation chartered by the United States military to transport 96 American soldiers to South Vietnam, disappears over the western Pacific.
 May 6 – A Channel Airways Douglas C-47 Dakota crashes into a hill on the Isle of Wight in bad weather, while en route from Jersey to London's Southend Airport, killing 12 of the 18 on board.
 May 12 – An Eastern Provincial Airlines Canso flying boat sinks at Godthab Harbour, Greenland, killing 15 of the 21 on board.
 May 22 – Continental Airlines Flight 11, a Boeing 707 flying from Chicago, Illinois, to Kansas City, Missouri, breaks up in mid-air near Unionville, Missouri, after a passenger's bomb explodes in the lavatory, killing all 45 people on board.
 June 3 – Air France Flight 007, a chartered Boeing 707, catches fire after overshooting the runway on takeoff, killing all but two of the 130 passengers and crew on board; among the fatalities are many of the civic and cultural leaders of Atlanta, Georgia; it is the worst single-aircraft accident to that date.
 June 22 – Air France Flight 117, a Boeing 707 operating an international multi-leg flight from Paris, France, to Santiago, Chile, crashes into a forested hill on the island of Guadeloupe, while approaching Pointe-à-Pitre International Airport; all 113 on board are killed; the cause of the crash is never determined.
 June 30 – Aeroflot Flight 902, a Tupolev Tu-104 operating a domestic flight in the Soviet Union, is shot down by a missile near Voznesenka, Krasnoyarsk Krai; all 84 people on board die in Russia's worst air accident to that date.
 July 7 – Alitalia Flight 771, a Douglas DC-8 operating a multi-leg flight between Sydney, Australia, and Rome, Italy, hits high terrain while descending near Junnar in India, due to navigation error; all 94 on board are killed.
 July 19 – United Arab Airlines Flight 869, a de Havilland DH-106 Comet 4C operating an international scheduled flight from Hong Kong to Cairo, via Bangkok, crashes into the Khao Yai mountain while descending to Bangkok; all 26 people on board lose their lives.
 July 22 – Canadian Pacific Air Lines Flight 301, a Bristol Britannia destined for Nadi, Fiji, crashes during an attempted "go-around" on a three-engined approach at Honolulu Airport, Hawaii, after experiencing engine problems shortly after takeoff; 27 of the 40 on board are killed.
 July 28 – Aeroflot Flight 415, an Antonov An-10 operating a domestic flight in the Soviet Union, crashes into a mountain near Sochi Airport due to ATC and crew errors; all 81 on board lose their lives.
 September 3 – Aeroflot Flight 3, a Tupolev Tu-104 operating a domestic flight in the Soviet Union, crashes near Kuruna, Nanaysky District, due to an unexplained loss of control; all 86 on board are killed.
 November 23 – United Airlines Flight 297, a Vickers Viscount 745D operating a multi-leg flight between the US states of New Jersey and Georgia, crashes near Ellicott City, Maryland, following a bird strike; all 17 people on board lose their lives.
 November 27 – Varig Flight 810, a Boeing 707-441 flying from Rio de Janeiro, Brazil, to Los Angeles, California, United States, crashes into a mountain near Lima airport in Peru, killing all 97 occupants.
 November 30 – Eastern Air Lines Flight 512, a Douglas DC-7B operating a domestic flight from Charlotte, North Carolina, United States, to New York City, crashes as a result of pilot error during a missed approach at New York's Idlewild Airport; 25 of the 51 on board are killed.
 December 19 – A LOT Vickers Viscount Warsaw crashes on approach to Okecie International Airport, Warsaw, Poland, due to loss of control; all 33 passengers and crew on board lose their lives.

1963 

 February 1 – In the Ankara mid-air collision, Middle East Airlines Flight 265, a Vickers Viscount, collides with a Turkish Air Force Douglas C-47, killing all 17 on board both aircraft and 87 on the ground.
 February 12 – Northwest Orient Airlines Flight 705, a Boeing 720, breaks up in turbulence associated with a severe thunderstorm and crashes into the Everglades; all 43 passengers and crew members on board are killed.
 March 5 – Aeroflot Flight 191, an Ilyushin Il-18, crashes on landing at Ashgabat International Airport due to a dust storm, killing 12 of 54 on board.
 April 4 – Aeroflot Flight 25, an Ilyushin Il-18, crashes in Tatarstan after suffering an engine malfunction, killing all 67 people aboard.
 June 3 – Northwest Airlines Flight 293, a Douglas DC-7C operating a military charter crashes into the sea off Annette Island, Alaska for reasons unknown. All 101 passengers and crew are killed.
 July 2 – Mohawk Airlines Flight 121, a Martin 4-0-4, crashes near Rochester, New York, while attempting takeoff, killing seven of the 43 people on board.
 July 3 – New Zealand National Airways Corporation Flight 441, a Douglas DC-3 en route from Whenuapai Airport, Auckland to Tauranga, crashes into the Kaimai Ranges; all 23 aboard die, making it the worst air disaster in mainland New Zealand to date.
 July 13 – Aeroflot Flight 12, a Tupolev Tu-104, crashes on approach to Irkutsk following a premature descent, killing 33 of 35 on board.
 July 27 – United Arab Airlines Flight 869, a de Havilland Comet 4C, crashes into the sea while on approach to Bombay Airport, India, killing all 63 on board.
 August 21 – An Aeroflot Tupolev Tu-124 ditches in the Neva river in Leningrad after engine failure; there are no fatalities among the 52 on board, but the aircraft is destroyed.
 August 24 – Aeroflot Flight 663, an Avia 14P, crashes into a mountain near Gegechkori, Georgia in bad weather after the pilot deviated from the flight route; all 32 on board die.
 September 4 – Swissair Flight 306, a Sud Aviation Caravelle, crashes near Dürrenäsch, Switzerland, due to an in-flight fire, killing all 80 on board.
 November 8 – Aero Flight 217, a Douglas DC-3, crashes in poor visibility near Mariehamn Airport, killing 22 out of 25 on board.
 November 29 – Trans-Canada Air Lines Flight 831, a Douglas DC-8, crashes shortly after takeoff from Montreal/Dorval Airport, killing all 118 people on board.
 December 8 – Pan Am Flight 214, a Boeing 707, is struck by positive lightning and crashes near Elkton, Maryland, killing all 81 people on board.

1964 
 February 25 – Eastern Air Lines Flight 304, a Douglas DC-8 flying from New Orleans International Airport to Washington National Airport, crashes into Lake Pontchartrain, killing all 51 passengers and seven crew aboard.
 February 29 – British Eagle International Airlines Flight 802, a Bristol Britannia, crashes into a mountain near Innsbruck, Austria. All 75 passengers and eight crew are killed in the crash.
 March 1 – Paradise Airlines Flight 901A, a Lockheed L-049 Constellation, crashes near Lake Tahoe, killing all 85 aboard when it collides with a mountain.
 May 7 – Pacific Air Lines Flight 773, a Fairchild F27, crashes near San Ramon, California, killing all 44 aboard, after a passenger shoots both the captain and first officer before turning the gun on himself.
 June 20 – Civil Air Transport Flight 106, a Curtiss C-46, crashes near Shenkang, Taiwan, killing all 57 on board.
 July 9 – United Airlines Flight 823, a Vickers Viscount, crashes near Parrottsville, Tennessee, after a fire on board; all 39 passengers and crew die.
 September 2 – Aeroflot Flight 721, an Ilyushin Il-18, crashes into a hillside while on approach to Yuzhno-Sakhalinsk Airport due to pilot error, killing 87 of 93 on board.
 November 15 – Bonanza Air Lines Flight 114, a Fairchild F27, flies into a mountain in poor weather while on a nighttime approach to Las Vegas, Nevada. All 29 aboard are killed.
 November 20 – Linjeflyg Flight 267, a Convair CV-340, crashes during the approach to Engelholm, Sweden, when, in instrument meteorological conditions, the crew abandons the set procedure and descends prematurely; 31 people are killed; 12 survive.
 November 23 – TWA Flight 800, a Boeing 707, suffers engine failure and crashes at Leonardo da Vinci-Fiumicino Airport, killing 50 of 73 on board; the cause is an inoperative thrust reverser.
 December 24 – Flying Tiger Line Flight 282, a Lockheed Constellation, crashes near San Bruno, California, after an unexplained course deviation, killing the crew of three.

1965 
 January 4 – Aeroflot Flight 20, an Ilyushin Il-18, crashes on approach to Alma-Ata in poor visibility, killing 64 of 103 on board.
 February 6 – LAN Chile Flight 107, a Douglas DC-6, crashes shortly after takeoff from Santiago-Los Cerrillos Airport in Santiago, Chile. All 87 passengers and crew on board are killed.
 February 8 – Eastern Air Lines Flight 663, a Douglas DC-7B on takeoff, overreacts in avoiding Pan Am Flight 212 (a Boeing 707) on approach, loses control, and crashes into the ocean several miles off Jones Beach State Park, New York, killing all 84 on board.
 March 8 – Aeroflot Flight 513, a Tupolev Tu-124V stalls and crashes after taking off from Kuybyshev Airport, Russia. 30 out of the 39 passengers and crew are killed.
 April 14 – British United Airways Flight 1030X, a Douglas C-47, crashes on landing at Jersey Airport due to pilot error; of the 27 passengers and crew on board, only a flight attendant survives.
 May 5 – Iberia Airlines Flight 401, a Lockheed L-1049 Super Constellation, crashes after striking a tractor on the runway at Los Rodeos Airport, Tenerife, during a go-around in foggy weather; 30 of 49 passengers and crew die.
 May 20 – PIA Flight 705, a Boeing 720, crashes on descent to Cairo International Airport, killing 119 of 125 on board in the worst-ever accident involving the 720.
 July 1 – Continental Airlines Flight 12, a Boeing 707, runs off the end of the runway at Kansas City Downtown Airport, breaking into three pieces; all 66 on board survive.
 July 8 – Canadian Pacific Air Lines Flight 21, a Douglas DC-6, crashes near 100 Mile House, British Columbia, after the explosion of a device in the lavatory; all 46 passengers and six crew aboard die.
 July 10 – A Skyways Coach-Air Avro 748 crashes on landing at Lympne Airport, Kent, United Kingdom, due to a waterlogged runway; all 52 on board survive; this crash marks the first loss of the Avro 748/HS 748.
 July 20 – In the Cambrian Airways Liverpool crash, a Vickers Viscount crashes on approach into Liverpool-Speke Airport, United Kingdom. Both crew members, as well as two on the ground, are killed.
 August 16 – United Airlines Flight 389, a Boeing 727, crashes into Lake Michigan at night, after the pilots apparently misread their altimeters; all 24 passengers and six crew die in the first fatal crash of the Boeing 727.
 September 17 – Pan Am Flight 292, a Boeing 707, crashes into Chances Peak, Montserrat, in stormy weather; all 30 on board die.
 November 8 – American Airlines Flight 383, a Boeing 727, crashes while on approach to Greater Cincinnati airport; of the 62 people on board, one flight attendant and three passengers survive.
 November 11 – United Airlines Flight 227, a Boeing 727, crashes short of the runway during landing at Salt Lake City International Airport, Utah; 43 of 91 aboard are killed.
 November 11 – Aeroflot Flight 99, a Tupolev Tu-124, crashes near Murmansk, Russia, due to pilot error, killing 32 of 64 on board.
 December 4 – The 1965 Carmel mid-air collision; Eastern Air Lines Flight 853, a Lockheed Super Constellation, collides with TWA Flight 42, a Boeing 707 over Carmel, New York. Flight 42 makes an emergency landing at John F. Kennedy International Airport; Flight 853 is forced to crash land on Hunt Mountain near Danbury, Connecticut, killing three passengers and one of the pilots on board. No casualties are reported on board Flight 42.

1966 
 January 15 – Avianca Flight 4, a Douglas C-54, suffers engine failure and crashes off Cartagena, Colombia, killing 56 of the 64 on board.
 January 24 – Air India Flight 101, a Boeing 707-437, crashes into the southwest face of Mont Blanc in France; all 106 passengers and 11 crew are killed. Sixteen years earlier Air India Flight 245 had crashed in almost exactly the same spot.
 January 28 – Lufthansa Flight 005, a Convair 440, crashes at Bremen Airport; all 46 on board die.
 February 2 – Pakistan International Airlines Flight 17, a Sikorsky S-61 helicopter, crashes near Faridpur, Bangladesh, Pakistan; of the 23 on board, only a passenger survives.
 February 4 – All Nippon Airways Flight 60, a Boeing 727-100, crashes into Tokyo Bay, Japan; all 133 aboard are killed in Japan's worst air disaster at that time.
 February 17 – Aeroflot Flight 65, a Tupolev Tu-114, crashes on takeoff from Sheremetyevo International Airport due to crew and ATC errors, killing 21 of 63 on board.
 March 4 – Canadian Pacific Air Lines Flight 402, a McDonnell Douglas DC-8-43, crashes on landing at Tokyo International Airport in Japan, killing 64 passengers and crew; eight passengers survive.
 March 5 – BOAC Flight 911, a Boeing 707 bound for Hong Kong, breaks up in mid-air and crashes at Mount Fuji near Gotenba, Japan, killing all 124 passengers and crew.
 March 18 – United Arab Airlines Flight 749, an Antonov An-24, crashes while attempting to land at Cairo International Airport. All 30 passengers and crew on board are killed.
 April 22 – American Flyers Airline Flight 280/D, a Lockheed L-188 Electra, crashes into a hill short of Ardmore Municipal Airport in Oklahoma, United States. 83 of the 98 passengers and crew on board are killed.
 April 23 – Aeroflot Flight 2723, an Ilyushin Il-14, ditches in the Caspian Sea following unexplained engine problems; all 33 on board die.
 April 27 – LANSA Flight 501, a Lockheed L-749A Constellation, crashes into a mountain in Tomas District, Peru, killing all 49 passengers and crew on board.
 August 6 – Braniff Flight 250, a BAC One-Eleven, flies into an active squall line and breaks apart in mid-air near Falls City, Nebraska. All 42 on board are killed.
 September 1 – Britannia Airways Flight 105, a Bristol Britannia, crashes on approach to Jože Pučnik Airport, Slovenia, due to an incorrectly set altimeter, killing 98 of 117 passengers and crew on board.
 September 22 – Ansett-ANA Flight 149, a Vickers Viscount, crashes near Winton, Queensland, Australia, killing all 24 people on board.
 November 13 – All Nippon Airways Flight 533, a NAMC YS-11, plunges into Seto Inland Sea after an overrun at Matsuyama Airport, Shikoku, Japan, killing all 50 passengers and crew; this crash is the first loss of a YS-11.
 November 15 – Pan Am Flight 708, a Boeing 727, crashes near Berlin, Germany; all three crew members are killed.
 November 24 – TABSO Flight 101, an Ilyushin Il-18B, crashes into a wooded hillside shortly after takeoff from Bratislava, Czechoslovakia, killing all 82 aboard.

1967 
 February 16 – Garuda Indonesia Flight 708, a Lockheed L-188 Electra, crashes on landing at Sam Ratulangi Airport, killing 22 of 84 passengers on board; all eight crew survive.
 March 5 – Lake Central Flight 527, a Convair 580, crashes near Marseilles, Ohio, after a propeller detaches and severs the fuselage, causing a loss of control; all 38 on board die.
 March 5 – Varig Airlines Flight 837, a Douglas DC-8, crashes while on approach to Roberts International Airport due to pilot error, killing 51 of 90 on board as well as five on the ground.
 March 9 – TWA Flight 553, a McDonnell Douglas DC-9, collides with a Beechcraft Baron near Dayton, Ohio, killing all 26 on both planes.
 March 10 – West Coast Flight 720, a Fokker F27 Friendship crashes shortly after taking off from Klamath Falls, Oregon. All four occupants are killed.
 March 13 – South African Airways Flight 406, a Vickers Viscount 818, crashes into the sea while on approach to East London, South Africa, killing all 25 passengers and crew on board. The report on the accident speculated that the pilot of the plane suffered a fatal heart attack while on approach and the co-pilot was unable to regain control of the aircraft.
 March 30 – Delta Air Lines Flight 9877, a DC-8, stalls during a simulated two engine-out approach and crashes in New Orleans, killing all 6 people on board and 13 on the ground.
 April 11 – An Air Algérie DC-4 crashes into a mountain in Algeria, killing 35 out of the 39 on board.
 April 20 – The 1967 Nicosia Britannia disaster: a Globe Air-operated Bristol Britannia on a charter flight in bad weather near Lakatamia, Cyprus, killing 126 of the 130 on board.
 June 3 – In the 1967 Air Ferry DC-4 accident, a Douglas DC-4 crashes into a mountain en route from Manston Airport, England to Perpignan Airport, France. All 88 passengers and crew are killed.
 June 4 – In the Stockport air disaster, a British Midland Canadair C-4 Argonaut carrying passengers returning from Palma de Mallorca is on approach to Manchester Airport when an engine loses power because of a design failure in the aircraft's fuel system; of the 84 passengers aboard, 72 were killed.
 June 23 – Mohawk Airlines Flight 40, a BAC One-Eleven, crashes in Blossburg, Pennsylvania, killing all 34 people on board.
 June 30 – Thai Airways International Flight 601, a Sud Aviation Caravelle, crashes into the sea on landing at Kai Tak Airport, killing 24 of 80 on board.
 July 19 – Piedmont Airlines Flight 22, a Boeing 727 departing from Asheville, North Carolina, crashes shortly after takeoff after a mid-air collision with a twin-engine Cessna 310 on instrument approach to Asheville; all 82 passengers and crew on both aircraft die.
 September 5 – ČSA Flight 523, an Ilyushin Il-18D flight from Prague Ruzyně International Airport, Czechoslovakia, to Havana, crashes after takeoff from a refuelling stop in Gander, Canada, killing 37 of 69 people on board.
 October 12 – Cyprus Airways Flight 284, a de Havilland Comet, is destroyed by a bomb over the Mediterranean; all 66 passengers and crew die in the crash.
 November 4 – Iberia Airlines Flight 062, a Sud Aviation Caravelle, crashes at Black Down Hill, Sussex, United Kingdom; all 37 passengers and crew are killed.
 November 6 – TWA Flight 159, a Boeing 707, overruns the runway at Greater Cincinnati Airport and catches fire; all on board escape the aircraft, but a passenger dies four days later.
 November 16 – Aeroflot Flight 2230, an Ilyushin Il-18, crashes just after takeoff from Koltsovo Airport, killing all 107 passengers and crew on board in the worst-ever accident involving the Il-18; the cause of the crash remains undetermined.
 November 20 – TWA Flight 128, a Convair 880, crashes in Constance, Kentucky, on approach to Greater Cincinnati Airport, killing 70 of 82 persons on board.
 December 30 – Aeroflot Flight 51, an Antonov An-24, crashes on approach to Liepāja Airport, Latvia due to pilot error, killing 43 of 51 on board.

1968 
 January 6 – Aeroflot Flight 1668, an Antonov An-24, crashes shortly after takeoff from Olekminsk, Russia due to an unexplained loss of control, killing all 45 on board.
 February 16 – Civil Air Transport Flight 010, a Boeing 727, crashes at Hunan village, Linkou Township, Taipei County (now Linkou District, New Taipei City) due to pilot error, killing 21 of 63 on board and one person on the ground.
 February 29 – Aeroflot Flight 15, an Ilyushin Il-18D crashes en route from Yemelyanovo, Russia to Petropavlovsk-Kamchatsky, Russia; of the 84 on board, only one survives.
 March 6 – Air France Flight 212, a Boeing 707, crashes into the northwestern slope of La Soufrière Mountain in Guadeloupe with the loss of all 63 lives on board.
 March 24 – Aer Lingus Flight 712, a Vickers Viscount 803, crashes off the Irish coast; all 61 on board die.
 March 27 – Ozark Air Lines Flight 965, a Douglas DC-9, collides with a Cessna 150 while both aircraft are approaching the same runway at Lambert Field in St. Louis, Missouri. The DC-9 lands safely with no injuries to the 49 passengers and crew, while the two pilots in the Cessna are killed.
 April 8 – BOAC Flight 712, a Boeing 707, suffers an engine fire after takeoff from London Heathrow Airport; the plane makes an emergency landing at Heathrow, but five of 127 aboard die in the resulting fire.
 April 20 – South African Airways Flight 228, a Boeing 707, crashes just after takeoff from Strijdom International Airport, Windhoek, South West Africa (now Namibia), due to pilot error; of the 128 on board, only five survive.
 May 3 – Braniff Flight 352, a Lockheed L-188A Super Electra en route from Houston, Texas to Dallas, breaks up in mid-air in a thunderstorm and crashes near Dawson, Texas; killing its five crew and 80 passengers.
 May 22 – Los Angeles Airways Flight 841, a Sikorsky S-61L, crashes near Paramount, California, resulting in the loss of 23 lives.
 May 28 – Garuda Indonesia Flight 892, a Convair CV-990, stalls and crashes near Chhatrapati Shivaji Maharaj International Airport, 4–5 minutes after take-off, resulting in the death of everyone on board and one on the ground.
 July 1 – Seaboard World Airlines Flight 253A, a Douglas DC-8, is forced to land in the Soviet Union; on board are over 200 American troops bound for Vietnam.
 July 3 – In the 1968 BKS Air Transport Heathrow crash, an Airspeed Ambassador freight aircraft experiences metal fatigue and crashes while landing, striking two unoccupied British European Airways airliners. Six of the freighter's crew of eight are killed, as are eight racehorses being transported. All Airspeed Ambassadors are grounded until a redesign strengthens the flaps.
 July 23 – Three members of Popular Front for the Liberation of Palestine hijack El Al Flight 426 from Rome to Tel Aviv. Diverting to Algiers the negotiations extend over 40 days. Both the hijackers and the hostages go free.
 August 14 – Los Angeles Airways Flight 417, a Sikorsky S-61L prototype, crashes in Compton, California, resulting in the loss of 21 lives.
 September 11 – Air France Flight 1611, a Sud Aviation SE-210 Caravelle, crashes near Nice, France, killing all 95 passengers and crew on board.
 October 25 – Northeast Airlines Flight 946, a Fairchild 227, crashes near Etna, New Hampshire, killing 32 passengers and crew.
 November 22 – Japan Airlines Flight 2, a Douglas DC-8, ditches in San Francisco Bay as a result of pilot error, all on board survive.
 December 2 – Wien Consolidated Airlines Flight 55, a Fairchild F-27B, crashes into Pedro Bay, Alaska. All 39 passengers and crew on board are killed.
 December 12 – Pan Am Flight 217, a Boeing 707, crashes near Caracas, Venezuela, as a result of pilot error; all 51 on board die.
 December 24 – Allegheny Airlines Flight 736, a Convair CV-580, crashes while on approach to Bradford Regional Airport. 20 of the 47 passengers and crew on board are killed.
 December 27 – North Central Airlines Flight 458, a Convair CV-580, crashes into a hangar at O'Hare International Airport in Chicago, Illinois, killing 27 of the 45 people on board and one person on the ground.
 December 31 – MacRobertson Miller Airlines Flight 1750, a Vickers Viscount, crashes near Port Hedland in Western Australia, killing all 26 people on board.

1969 
 January 5 – Ariana Afghan Airlines Flight 701, a Boeing 727-100C, arriving at London Gatwick Airport from Frankfurt Airport crashes into a house in dense fog, killing 48 of the 62 persons aboard; a married couple living at the house also die, but their baby survives.
 January 6 – Allegheny Airlines Flight 737, a Convair CV-580, crashes while on approach to Bradford Regional Airport. 11 of the 28 passengers and crew on board are killed.
 January 13 – Scandinavian Airlines Flight 933, a Douglas DC-8, crashes into Santa Monica Bay due to pilot error, killing 15 of 45 on board.
 January 18 – United Airlines Flight 266, a Boeing 727, en route from Los Angeles to Milwaukee loses all electrical power and crashes into Santa Monica Bay; six crew and 32 passengers are killed.
 February 18 – Hawthorne Nevada Airlines Flight 708, a Douglas DC-3, crashes near Lone Pine, California, killing all 35 people on board.
 February 24 – Far Eastern Air Transport Flight 104, a Handley Page Dart Herald, suffers engine failure and crashes while on approach to Tainan Airport, Taiwan; all 36 on board die.
 March 5 – Prinair Flight 277, a de Havilland Heron, crashes into mountainous territory at Luquillo, Puerto Rico, killing all 19 people on board.
 March 16 – Viasa Flight 742, a McDonnell Douglas DC-9-30, crashes on takeoff from Maracaibo, Venezuela. All 84 passengers on board, plus 71 people on the ground are killed in the crash. At 155 people dead, it was the worst aviation disaster in history at that time.
 March 20 – In the 1969 Aswan Ilyushin Il-18 crash, a United Arab Airlines flight crashes while attempting to land at Aswan International Airport. 100 of the 105 passengers and crew on board are killed.
 April 2 – LOT Polish Airlines Flight 165, an Antonov An-24, crashes in southern Poland, killing all 53 people on board.
 April 28 – LAN Chile Flight 160, a Boeing 727, crashes near Colina, Chile; all 60 on board survive.
 June 4 – Mexicana Flight 704, a Boeing 727, crashes near Salinas Victoria in Mexico. All 79 passengers and crew on board are killed.
 June 23 – In the Yukhnov mid-air collision, Aeroflot Flight 831, an Ilyushin Il-14, collides in mid-air with a Soviet Air Force Antonov An-12 over Yukhnovsky District, Russia, killing all 120 people on both aircraft.
 August 29 – In the TWA Flight 840 hijacking, two operatives from the Popular Front for the Liberation of Palestine force a Boeing 707 to land at Damascus, Syria; all passengers are released except for two passengers who are released two months later; there are no casualties to the 127 on board, but the aircraft's nose section is blown up.
 September 9 – Allegheny Airlines Flight 853, a Douglas DC-9, collides in flight with a Piper PA-28 Cherokee and crashes near Fairland, Indiana, killing all 83 occupants aboard the two aircraft.
 September 12 – Philippine Airlines Flight 158, a BAC One-Eleven, crashes on approach to Manila International Airport, killing 45 of the 47 passengers and crew on board.
 November 19 – Mohawk Airlines Flight 411, a Fairchild 227, crashes near Glens Falls, New York, killing all 14 people on board.
 November 20 – Nigeria Airways Flight 825, a Vickers VC-10, crashes on approach to Lagos International Airport, killing all 87 passengers and crew on board.
 December 3 – Air France Flight 212, a Boeing 707-328B, crashes into the sea shortly after takeoff from Simón Bolívar International Airport with the loss of all 62 on board.
 December 8 – Olympic Airways Flight 954, a DC-6, crashes into Mt. Paneio while on approach to Athens-Ellinikon International Airport. All 90 passengers and crew on board are killed.

1970s

1970 
 January 5 – A Spantax Convair 990 Coronado crashes shortly after takeoff from Stockholm's Arlanda Airport when the flight crew loses control of the aircraft; five of the ten people on board are killed.
 February 4 – Aerolíneas Argentinas Flight 707, a Hawker Siddeley HS 748 operating a multi-leg flight from Paraguay to Argentina, crashes near Loma Alta when the pilots lose control of the aircraft due to severe turbulence; all 37 passengers and crew die.
 February 6 – Aeroflot Flight U-45, an Ilyushin Il-18 operating a domestic flight in Uzbekistan, crashes into a mountain on approach to Samarkand International Airport due to ATC error; 92 of the 106 people on board the aircraft were killed.
 February 15 – A Dominicana Douglas DC-9 crashes shortly after takeoff from Santo Domingo in the Dominican Republic, due to engine failure; all 102 people on board are killed.
 February 21 – Swissair Flight 330, a Convair CV-990 bound for Tel Aviv, Israel, en route to Hong Kong, crashes when a bomb detonates in the cargo hold nine minutes after takeoff from Zurich International Airport, Switzerland; all 38 passengers and nine crew die.
 March 17 – Eastern Air Lines Shuttle Flight 1320, a Douglas DC-9-31 flying from Newark, New Jersey, to Boston, Massachusetts, is hijacked by a suicidal man who shoots both pilots before being subdued; the captain makes a successful emergency landing in Boston where the hijacker is arrested; the co-pilot dies from his injuries.
 March 31 – Japan Airlines Flight 351, a Boeing 727 operating a domestic flight from Tokyo to Fukuoka, is hijacked by a Japanese Red Army faction who force the crew to proceed to North Korea after releasing 21 passengers at Fukuoka Airport; the hijackers eventually surrender and all 129 people on board the flight are unharmed.
 April 1 – Aeroflot Flight 1661, an Antonov An-24 operating a domestic flight in Russia, crashes on climbout after departing from Novosibirsk Tolmachevo Airport, due to a collision with a weather balloon; all 45 passengers and crew are killed.
 May 2 – ALM Flight 980, a Douglas DC-9 operated by Overseas National Airways, ditches into the Caribbean Sea near St. Croix, Virgin Islands, due to fuel exhaustion after several unsuccessful landing attempts at St. Maarten in the Dutch Antilles; 23 of the 63 people on board die.
 July 3 – Dan-Air Flight 1903, a de Havilland Comet 4 operating a flight from Manchester, England, to Barcelona, Spain, crashes near Arbúcies in Catalonia on approach to El Prat Josep Tarradellas Airport; all 112 people on board the aircraft are killed.
 July 5 – Air Canada Flight 621, a Douglas DC-8 operating a flight from Montreal, Canada, to Los Angeles, United States, crashes during a failed landing attempt at its scheduled stopover at Toronto Pearson International Airport, killing all 109 on board.
 August 9 – LANSA Flight 502, a Lockheed L-188 Electra turboprop operating a domestic flight in Peru, crashes shortly after takeoff from Cusco's Quispiquilla Airport due to engine failure, killing 99 of the 100 people on board, including 49 U.S. high school exchange students, as well as two on the ground.
 August 12 – China Airlines Flight 206, a NAMC YS-11, crashes into Yuan Mountain in thick fog during a severe thunderstorm, while on approach to Taipei International Airport; 14 of the 31 people on board lose their lives.

 September 2 – Aeroflot Flight 3630, a Tupolev Tu-124 en route from southern Russia to Lithuania, crashes after the pilots lose control of the aircraft at cruise altitude between Rostov-on-Don Airport and Vilnius Airport, on the second leg of the flight; all 37 passengers and crew are killed.
 September 6 – The Popular Front for the Liberation of Palestine orchestrates the Dawson's Field hijackings of El Al Flight 219 (Boeing 707), Pan Am Flight 93 (Boeing 747), Swissair Flight 100 (Douglas DC-8), TWA Flight 741 (Boeing 707), and (on September 9) BOAC Flight 775 (Vickers VC10); the unprecedented scale of the incident draws international outrage and contributes to the eventual widespread implementation of systematic air passenger screening; Flight 93 is the first ever loss of the Boeing 747.
 September 8 – Trans International Airlines Flight 863, a Douglas DC-8 on a re-positioning flight, crashes during takeoff from John F. Kennedy International Airport, New York, killing all 11 crew members on board.
 October 2 – A chartered Martin 4-0-4 airliner crashes into a mountain near Silver Plume, Colorado, United States, while carrying members of the Wichita State University football team to Logan, Utah, for a game; 31 of the 40 people on board are killed.
 October 15 – Aeroflot Flight 244, an Antonov An-24 flying from Georgia to Abkhazia along the Black Sea coast, is hijacked by a Lithuanian national and his 13-year-old son, who kill one flight attendant and force the plane to divert to Trabzon, Turkey, where they surrender to the Turkish government; this is the first known successful airline hijacking in the Soviet Union.
 November 14 – Southern Airways Flight 932, a chartered Douglas DC-9 flying from North Carolina to West Virginia, United States, crashes on approach to Huntington's Tri-State Airport due to pilot error; all 75 on board die, including 37 players of the Marshall University football team and eight of the coaching staff.

1971 
 January 22 – An Aeroflot Antonov An-12 crashes due to icing while on approach to Surgut International Airport, RSFSR, Soviet Union, killing all 14 on board the aircraft.
 January 30 – In the 1971 Indian Airlines hijacking, a Fokker F-27 Friendship 100 operating a domestic passenger flight is hijacked en route from Srinagar to Jammu and flown to Lahore in Pakistan where the passengers and crew are released and the plane is subsequently destroyed.
 January 31 – An Aeroflot Antonov An-12 crashes due to icing while on approach to Surgut International Airport, RSFSR, Soviet Union. All seven on board are killed.
 March 31 – Aeroflot Flight 1969, an Antonov An-10, crashes on approach to Voroshilovgrad Airport (now Luhansk Airport), Ukrainian SSR, following an unexplained structural failure of the right wing, killing all 65 on board.
 May 23 – Aviogenex Flight 130, a Tupolev Tu-134 flying from London's Gatwick Airport to Rijeka Airport in Croatia, crashes on landing at its destination due to pilot error, killing 78 of the 83 people on board.
 June 6 – Hughes Airwest Flight 706, a Douglas DC-9 operating a domestic flight from Los Angeles, California, to Seattle, Washington, United States, collides with a US Marine Corps McDonnell Douglas F-4B Phantom II fighter jet, and crashes into the San Gabriel Mountains near Duarte, California, killing all 49 people on board; the fighter jet pilot is also killed, but the Radar Intercept Officer successfully bails out.
 June 7 – Allegheny Airlines Flight 485, a Convair CV-580 operating a multi-leg domestic flight between Washington, D.C., and Virginia in the United States, crashes on approach to Tweed New Haven Airport, Connecticut, killing 28 of the 31 people on board.
 July 3 – Toa Domestic Airlines Flight 63, a NAMC YS-11 operating a domestic flight in Japan, crashes into Yokotsu Mountain near Hakodate Airport on Japan's Hokkaidō island, killing all 68 passengers and crew in the worst-ever disaster involving the YS-11.
 July 25 – Aeroflot Flight 1912, a Tupolev Tu-104 operating a multi-leg domestic flight between Odessa and Vladivostok in the Soviet Union, lands hard and crashes short of the runway at Irkutsk Airport, killing 97 of the 126 people on board.
 July 30 – All Nippon Airways Flight 58, a Boeing 727-200 operating a domestic flight from Sapporo to Tokyo, Japan, collides with a JASDF F-86 Sabre fighter jet at Shizukuishi near Morioka, killing all 162 passengers and crew on board; the F-86 pilot parachutes to safety, but is later arrested and charged with involuntary manslaughter.
 July 30 – Pan Am Flight 845, a Boeing 747-100 flying from Los Angeles, California, United States, to Tokyo, Japan, collides with approach lighting structures on taking off from its intermediate stop, San Francisco International Airport, and then crashes after turning back to attempt an emergency landing at the same airport; there are no fatalities but 29 of the 199 passengers are injured.
Of the 34 on board, only two survive.
 September 4 – Alaska Airlines Flight 1866, a Boeing 727 operating a flight from Anchorage, Alaska, to Seattle, Washington, United States, crashes into a mountain in the Tongass National Forest near Juneau, Alaska, killing all 111 on board.
 September 6 – Paninternational Flight 112, a BAC One-Eleven flying from Hamburg, Germany, to Málaga, Spain, suffers dual engine failure shortly after takeoff and crashes onto the motorway near Hamburg Airport, killing 22 of the 121 people on board.
 September 16 – Malév Flight 110, a Tupolev Tu-134, crashes while on approach to Kiev-Borispol Airport, Ukrainian SSR, in foggy weather, killing all 49 passengers and crew on board.
 October 2 – British European Airways Flight 706, a Vickers Vanguard turboprop flying from London's Heathrow Airport to Salzburg, Austria, breaks up in mid-air and crashes near Aarsele, Belgium, after suffering explosive decompression; all 63 people on board are killed.
 October 10 – Aeroflot Flight 773, a Tupolev Tu-104, breaks up and crashes near Baranovo, Naro-Fominsky District, Russia when a bomb placed in the cabin explodes; all 25 on board die.
 November 10 – A Merpati Nusantara Vickers Viscount 828 crashes in the Indian Ocean off the west coast of Sumatra, Indonesia, on approach to Tabing Airport in Padang, due to poor visibility in bad weather; all 69 people on board are killed.
 November 12 – Aeroflot Flight N-63, an Antonov An-24, stalls and crashes near Vinnitsa Airport, Ukrainian SSR, during a go-around in foggy weather, killing all 48 people on board.
 November 20 – China Airlines Flight 825, a Sud Aviation Caravelle, explodes in mid-air and crashes into the Taiwan Strait while on a flight from Taipei to Hong Kong due to a terrorist bomb explosion, killing all 25 people on board.
 November 24 – Northwest Orient Airlines Flight 305, a Boeing 727 flying from Portland, Oregon, to Seattle, Washington, United States, is hijacked by an unidentified person who parachutes from the aircraft mid-flight after extorting US$200,000 of ransom money from the US government; the aircraft lands safely and all 41 on board are unharmed, but the perpetrator is never apprehended.
 December 1 – Aeroflot Flight 2174, an Antonov An-24, loses control and crashes on approach to Saratov Airport due to wing icing, killing all 57 on board.
 December 24 – LANSA Flight 508, a Lockheed L-188 Electra en route from Lima to Pucallpa, Peru, breaks apart in mid-air during a thunderstorm and crashes in the Amazon Rainforest; of the 92 on board, the sole survivor is a German teenager who falls  strapped to her seat, and then walks for 10 days through the rainforest before being rescued by local lumbermen.

1972 
 January 7 – Iberia Airlines Flight 602, a Sud Aviation SE 210 Caravelle flying from Valencia to Ibiza, crashes into a mountain while on approach to Ibiza Airport, killing all 104 passengers and crew on board.
 February 22 – Lufthansa Flight 649, a Boeing 747 en route from Tokyo to Frankfurt, is hijacked during the Delhi–Athens leg and forced to divert to Aden, South Yemen, where all 182 passengers and crew are released in exchange for a $5 million ransom.
 March 3 – Mohawk Airlines Flight 405, a Fairchild F-27 flying from New York City to Albany, New York, crashes while descending to land at Albany County Airport, killing 16 of the 48 people on board and one on the ground.
 March 14 – Sterling Airways Flight 296, a Sud Caravelle flying from Colombo, Ceylon, to Copenhagen, Denmark, crashes near Kalba in the United Arab Emirates due to pilot error; all 112 on board die in the worst air disaster in the history of the UAE.
 March 19 – EgyptAir Flight 763, a McDonnell Douglas DC-9 flying from Egypt to South Yemen, crashes on approach to Aden International Airport, killing all 30 passengers and crew.
 May 8 – Sabena Flight 571, a Boeing 707 flying from Brussels to Tel Aviv, is hijacked by members of the Black September Organisation demanding the release of Palestinian prisoners by Israel; during a commando raid the hijackers are killed or captured and one hostage terminally injured, the others freed.
 May 18 – Aeroflot Flight 1491, an Antonov An-10, suffers in-flight structural failure on approach to Kharkiv Airport in Ukraine; all 122 passengers and crew on board are killed.
 May 30 – Delta Air Lines Flight 9570, a McDonnell Douglas DC-9 operating as a training flight, crashes while attempting to land at Greater Southwest International Airport in Fort Worth, Texas, United States, due to wake turbulence from a DC-10 that landed moments earlier; all four crew members are killed.
 June 12 – American Airlines Flight 96, a McDonnell Douglas DC-10, suffers explosive depressurisation when one of its cargo doors fails in mid-flight; the crew performs an emergency landing at Detroit Metro Airport, Michigan, where all 67 on board are evacuated safely.
 June 14 – Japan Airlines Flight 471, a Douglas DC-8 en route from Bangkok, Thailand, to New Delhi, India, crashes on approach to Palam Airport, killing 82 of the 87 on board and three people on the ground.
 June 18 – British European Airways Flight 548, a Hawker Siddeley Trident, undergoes a series of stalls due to pilot error, followed by a deep stall, and crashes near Staines, United Kingdom; all 118 on board are killed.
 June 24 – Prinair Flight 191, a de Havilland Heron, over-rotates because of pilot error and crashes in Ponce, Puerto Rico, killing five of the 20 people on board.
 June 29 – In the 1972 Lake Winnebago mid-air collision, North Central Airlines Flight 290, a Convair CV-580, and Air Wisconsin Flight 671, a de Havilland Canada DHC-6 Twin Otter, collide over Lake Winnebago near Appleton, Wisconsin, killing all 13 people on board the two aircraft.
 July 2 – Pan Am Flight 841, a Boeing 747 en route from San Francisco to Saigon, South Vietnam, is hijacked over the South China Sea by a political protester; the hijacker is killed at a fake re-fuelling stop and no one else is harmed.
 August 14 – In the 1972 Königs Wusterhausen air disaster, an Interflug Ilyushin Il-62 flying from East Germany to Bulgaria, crashes near Königs Wusterhausen, to the southeast of Berlin; all 156 passengers and crew are killed in Germany's worst air disaster.
 August 16 – A Burma Airways Douglas C-47 crashes into the sea, shortly after departing from Thandwe Airport in Burma, killing 25 of the 28 on board.
 August 31 – Aeroflot Flight 558, an Ilyushin Il-18 en route from Karaganda, Kazakhstan, to Moscow in the Soviet Union, crashes following an in-flight fire; all 102 people on board are killed.
 September 24 – Japan Airlines Flight 472, a Douglas DC-8 flying from London to Tokyo with 122 on board, overshoots the runway after landing at the wrong airport; there are no fatalities.
 October 1 – Aeroflot Flight 1036, an Ilyushin Il-18V, crashes into the Black Sea during takeoff from Sochi International Airport in the Soviet Union, for reasons unknown; all 109 passengers and crew are killed.
 October 13 – Aeroflot Flight 217, an Ilyushin Il-62 flying from Paris to Moscow, crashes on approach to Sheremetyevo International Airport for reasons unknown; all 174 passengers and crew on board are killed.
 October 13 – Uruguayan Air Force Flight 571, a Fairchild F-27 en route from Montevideo, Uruguay, to Santiago, Chile, crashes in the Andes due to pilot error; 29 of the 45 on board lose their lives, and the remaining 16 survive for 72 days by feeding on the dead.
 October 29 – Lufthansa Flight 615, a Boeing 727 en route from Damascus to Frankfurt, is hijacked by sympathizers of Black September who demand the release of the three surviving perpetrators of the Munich massacre; the ensuing stand-off is eventually resolved and there are no casualties.
 November 15 – Ansett Airlines Flight 232, a Fokker F27 Friendship operating a domestic flight in Australia, is hijacked on approach to Alice Springs; after landing at the airport, the perpetrator fatally shoots himself during a confrontation with the police.
 December 3 – Spantax Flight 275, a Convair 990 Coronado, crashes in Tenerife while taking off in almost zero visibility; all 155 passengers and crew on board are killed.

 December 8 – United Airlines Flight 553, a Boeing 737, crashes after aborting its landing attempt at Chicago Midway International Airport, killing 43 of 60 people on board and two people on the ground; one of the fatalities is Dorothy Hunt, wife of Watergate conspirator E. Howard Hunt. The crash is the first fatal crash involving the 737-200.
 December 20 – In the 1972 Chicago–O'Hare runway collision, Delta Air Lines Flight 954, a Convair CV-880, and North Central Airlines Flight 575, a McDonnell Douglas DC-9, collide on the runway due to ATC communication errors, killing 10 people and injuring 17.
 December 23 – Braathens SAFE Flight 239, a Fokker F-28 operating a domestic flight in Norway, crashes into terrain in Asker on approach to Oslo Airport, Fornebu, killing 40 of the 45 people on board.
 December 29 – Eastern Air Lines Flight 401, a Lockheed L-1011 TriStar flying from New York to Miami, crashes in the Florida Everglades when the crew is distracted by a faulty gear-down light, resulting in the deaths of 101 of the 176 people on board; this is the first crash of a widebody aircraft and the first loss of a Lockheed Tristar.

1973 
 January 21 – Aeroflot Flight 6263, an Antonov An-24, loses control, breaks up and crashes while on approach to Perm Airport for reasons unknown, killing all 39 on board.
 January 22 – In the Kano air disaster, a Boeing 707 crashes while attempting to land at Kano International Airport in Nigeria, killing 176 of the 202 passengers and crew on board.
 January 29 – EgyptAir Flight 741 crashed in the Kyrenia mountain range while on approach to Nicosia International Airport; all 37 on board die.
 February 19 – Aeroflot Flight 141, a Tupolev Tu-154, crashes short of the runway at Prague Ruzyně Airport for reasons unknown, killing 66 of 100 on board.
 February 21 – Libyan Arab Airlines Flight 114, a Boeing 727, strays off course and is shot down by Israeli jets in the Sinai war zone, killing 108 of 113 people on board.
 February 24 – Aeroflot Flight 630, an Ilyushin Il-18, crashes  from Ura-Tube, Tajikistan, due to loss of control as a result of pilot error, killing all 79 on board.
 March 3 – Balkan Bulgarian Airlines Flight 307, an Ilyushin Il-18, crashes short of the runway at Sheremetyevo International Airport, killing all 25 on board.
 March 5 – Nantes mid-air collision, an Iberia McDonnell Douglas DC-9 collides with a Spantax Convair CV-990. All 68 people on board the DC-9 were killed. The CV-990 was able to make a successful emergency landing at Cognac – Châteaubernard Air Base.
 April 10 – Invicta International Airlines Flight 435, a Vickers Vanguard 952 from Bristol Lulsgate to Basle, flies into a hillside near Hochwald, Switzerland, somersaults and breaks up, killing 108 with 37 survivors.
 May 18 – Aeroflot Flight 109, a Tupolev Tu-104, is hijacked en route to Chita from Irkutsk; a bomb the hijacker held detonates and the aircraft crashes east of Lake Baikal, killing all 81 on board.
 May 31 – Indian Airlines Flight 440, a Boeing 737, crashes while on approach to Palam Airport in New Delhi, India. 48 of the 65 passengers and crew on board are killed in the accident.
 June 10 – In the 1973 Nepal plane hijack, a de Havilland Canada DHC-6 Twin Otter operated by Royal Nepal Airlines is hijacked after takeoff from Biratnagar Airport, Nepal. The hijackers force the pilot to land in a grass field in Forbesganj, Bihar, India. All 19 occupants survive.
 June 20 – Aeroméxico Flight 229, a Douglas DC-9, crashes into the side of Las Minas Mountain while on approach to Lic. Gustavo Díaz Ordaz International Airport; all 27 on board die.
 July 11 – Varig Flight 820, a Boeing 707, experiences an onboard fire and crashes near Paris, France, killing 123 out of 134 on board.
 July 22 – Pan Am Flight 816, a Boeing 707, crashes shortly after takeoff from Faa'a's airport Tahiti, French Polynesia, killing 77 out of 78 on board.
 July 23 – Japan Air Lines Flight 404, a Boeing 747, is hijacked after takeoff from Amsterdam Schiphol Airport in the Netherlands; one hijacker is killed and the flight's purser injured by a grenade blast; after several days and multiple flight legs, the passengers are released in Benghazi, Libya, and the aircraft is blown up on the ground; this is the first loss of a Boeing 747-200.
 July 23 – Ozark Air Lines Flight 809, a Fairchild-Hiller FH-227, crashes short of the runway at St. Louis International Airport due to windshear from a thunderstorm, killing 38 of 44 on board.
 July 31 – Delta Air Lines Flight 723, a Douglas DC-9, descends prematurely and crashes on final approach to Boston Logan International Airport, killing all 89 on board; probable cause is unstabilized final approach by the flight crew.
 August 13 – Aviaco Flight 118, a Sud Caravelle, en route from Madrid to A Coruña crashes while approaching A Coruña Alvedro airport, in Montrove, 2 km from the airport; all 85 on board die, and one on the ground.
 August 18 – Aeroflot Flight A-13, an Antonov An-24, crashes near Baku, Azerbaijan after striking a cable on an oil rig following engine failure, killing 56 of 64 on board. The accident remains the deadliest in Azerbaijan.
 August 28 – TWA Flight 742, a Boeing 707, enters severe porpoising oscillations during the descent over the Pacific Ocean near Los Angeles; all on board escape the aircraft, but a passenger dies two days later.
 September 8 – World Airways Flight 802, a Douglas DC-8-63CF crashes on approach into Cold Bay Airport, Alaska. All six occupants are killed.
 September 11 – JAT Airways Flight 769, a Sud Aviation Caravelle, crashes into Mt. Maganik near Kolašin, Montenegro, killing all 41 on board.
 September 27 – Texas International Airlines Flight 655, a Convair 600, crashes into Black Fork Mountain while avoiding thunderstorms, killing all 11 passengers and crew on board.
 September 30 – Aeroflot Flight 3932, a Tupolev Tu-104, crashes shortly after takeoff from Koltsovo Airport in Sverdlovsk (now Yekaterinburg), Russia after the pilots became disorientated following electrical failure, killing all 108 on board.
 October 13 – Aeroflot Flight 964, a Tupolev Tu-104, crashes while on approach to Domodedovo International Airport, Moscow, Russia after the pilots became disorientated following electrical failure, killing all 122 on board in the deadliest accident involving the Tu-104.
 November 2 – Aeroflot Flight 19, a Yakovlev Yak-40, is hijacked ten minutes before landing at Bryansk Airport, Russia. The aircraft is then diverted to Moscow's Vnukovo Airport where it is stormed by the authorities, killing a hijacker, while another hijacker commits suicide. All other passengers and crew survive.
 November 3 – National Airlines Flight 27, a McDonnell Douglas DC-10 with 128 on board, suffers an uncontained engine failure at 39,000 feet 65 miles southwest of Albuquerque, New Mexico. Debris from the engine punctures the fuselage and a passenger is blown out of the aircraft, but the aircraft is able to land safely with no other casualties.
 November 3 – Pan Am Flight 160, a Boeing 707 operating a cargo flight, crashes after smoke in the cockpit prevents the crew from keeping control of the aircraft while attempting an emergency landing at Boston Logan International Airport, Massachusetts, killing all three crew members.
 November 25 – KLM Flight 861, a Boeing 747, is hijacked over Iraq. The hijackers force the crew to land at several different airports; the last one is at Dubai International Airport where the hijackers surrender to the authorities. All 264 people on board survive.
 December 16 – Aeroflot Flight 2022, a Tupolev Tu-124, crashes near Karacharovo, Russia after entering a nosedive following a failure in the horizontal stabilizer, killing all 51 on board.
 December 17 – Iberia Flight 933, a Douglas DC-10, crash lands on the runway of Boston Logan International Airport, Massachusetts, after colliding with the approach lighting system  short of the runway threshold. All 168 on board survive, but 3 occupants receive serious injuries.
 December 17 – In the 1973 Rome airport attacks and hijacking, armed gunmen kill two people in the terminal, then firebomb Pan Am Flight 110, a Boeing 707, killing 30 inside the aircraft. The gunmen then hijack Lufthansa Flight 303, a Boeing 737 en route to Munich, killing two more before landing and surrendering in Kuwait.
 December 22 – In the 1973 Royal Air Maroc Sud Aviation Caravelle crash, a Sud Aviation Caravelle operated by Sobelair crashes into Mount Mellaline near Tanger-Boukhalef Airport, Morocco, killing all 106 on board.

1974 
 January 6 – Commonwealth Commuter Flight 317, a Beechcraft Model 99A, crashes short of the runway on approach to Johnstown–Cambria County Airport, Pennsylvania following a premature descent, killing 12 of the 17 on board.
 January 26 – Turkish Airlines Flight 301, a Fokker F28-1000, stalls and crashes after takeoff from Izmir Cumaovasi Airport due to wing icing; of the 73 on board, only seven survive.
 January 30 – Pan Am Flight 806, a Boeing 707-320B, crashes on approach to Pago Pago International Airport, American Samoa due to pilot error after encountering a microburst, killing 97 of 101 on board.
 March 3 – Turkish Airlines Flight 981, a McDonnell Douglas DC-10, crashes in the Ermenonville forest near Senlis, France, after the rear underfloor cargo door opens in mid-flight; all 346 on board die.
 March 15 – Sterling Airways Flight 901, a Sterling Airways Sud Aviation Caravelle suffers landing gear failure at Mehrabad International Airport; the right wing contacts the runway, rupturing a fuel tank and starting a fire that kills 15 of 92 passengers; all four crew survive.
 April 18 – Court Line Flight 95, a BAC One-Eleven, collides with a Piper Aztec on the runway at London Luton Airport, killing the pilot of the Aztec; there are no casualties on board the One-Eleven, but the aircraft is substantially damaged; the Aztec is written off.
 April 27 – An Aeroflot Ilyushin Il-18 crashes shortly after takeoff from Pulkovo Airport, Leningrad (now St. Petersburg), Russia due to loss of control following engine failure; all 109 on board die.
 July 10 – An EgyptAir Tupolev Tu-154 crashes near Cairo International Airport during a training flight, killing all six crew members on board.
 September 8 – TWA Flight 841, a Boeing 707, breaks up after a bomb explodes in the cargo hold and plunges into the Ionian Sea, killing all 88 on board.
 September 11 – Eastern Air Lines Flight 212, a McDonnell Douglas DC-9, crashes on approach to Charlotte, North Carolina; 72 of 82 people on board are killed.
 September 15 – Air Vietnam Flight 706, a Boeing 727, is hijacked and crashes in Phan Rang, Vietnam following an aborted landing; all 75 on board die.
 November 1 – Aeroflot Flight 662, an Antonov An-2, collides in mid-air with a Mil Mi-8 helicopter near Surgut, Russia due to ATC errors, killing all 38 on board both aircraft.
 November 20 – Lufthansa Flight 540 crashes shortly after takeoff in Nairobi, Kenya; 59 of 157 on board are killed in the first crash of a Boeing 747.
 December 1 – Northwest Airlines Flight 6231, a Boeing 727, stalls and crashes twelve minutes after takeoff from John F. Kennedy International Airport, New York due to wing icing caused by pilot error, killing the three crew.
 December 1 – TWA Flight 514, a Boeing 727 inbound to Dulles International Airport, crashes into Mount Weather in Bluemont, Virginia, killing all 92 on board.
 December 4 – Martinair Flight 138, a Douglas DC-8 on a charter flight, crashes into a mountain shortly before landing, on approach to Katunayake, Sri Lanka, for a refueling stop; killing all aboard – 182 Indonesian hajj pilgrims bound for Mecca, and nine crew members.
 December 22 – Avensa Flight 358, a McDonnell Douglas DC-9, suffers dual engine failure after takeoff and crashes near Maturín, Venezuela, killing all 77 on board.

1975 
 January 9 – Golden West Airlines Flight 261, a de Havilland Twin Otter, collides with a Cessna 150 near Whittier, California, killing all 14 people in both aircraft.
 January 30 – Turkish Airlines Flight 345, a Fokker F-28, crashes into the Sea of Marmara after a missed approach; all 42 on board die; the cause is never determined.
 June 24 – Eastern Air Lines Flight 66, a Boeing 727, encounters wind shear on final approach and strikes approach lights at John F. Kennedy International Airport, killing 113 of 124 people on board.
 August 3 – The Agadir air disaster: an Air Maroc-operated Boeing 707 owned by Royal Jordanian Airlines crashes while on approach to Agadir, Morocco due to pilot error; all 188 on board die in the worst-ever accident involving the Boeing 707.
 August 20 – ČSA Flight 540, an Ilyushin Il-62 crashes while on approach to Damascus, Syria. 126 of the 128 passengers and crew on board die in the accident.
 August 30 – Wien Air Alaska Flight 99, a Fairchild F-27, crashes into Seuvokuk Mountain, Alaska, while on approach to Gambell Airport, killing 10 of 32 on board.
 September 1 – Interflug Flight 1107, a Tupolev Tu-134, crashes while on approach to Leipzig, killing 27 of 34 on board.
 September 24 – Garuda Indonesia Flight 150, a Fokker F-28 Fellowship, crashes while on approach to Sultan Mahmud Badaruddin II Airport in foggy weather; 25 of 61 on board die; one person on the ground also dies.
 September 30 – Malév Flight 240, a Tupolev Tu-154, crashes on approach near Lebanon, killing all 60 people on board.
 October 30 – Inex-Adria Aviopromet Flight 450, a McDonnell Douglas DC-9, crashes on approach in Prague suburb, killing 75 of 120 on board.
 November 12 – Overseas National Airways Flight 032, a McDonnell Douglas DC-10 overruns the runway at John F. Kennedy Airport. Everyone on board survives while the aircraft was written-off as it was consumed by a fire.

1976 
 January 1 – Middle East Airlines Flight 438, a Boeing 720, crashes in Saudi Arabia when a bomb explodes in the forward baggage compartment, killing all 81 people on board.
 January 3 – Aeroflot Flight 2003, a Tupolev Tu-124, crashes just after takeoff from Vnukovo Airport due to instrument failure, killing all 61 passengers and crew on board and one person on the ground.
 January 15 – In the Taxi Aereo el Venado Douglas DC-4 accident, a Douglas DC-4 crashes into a mountain in Colombia killing all 13 on board.
 February 9 – Aeroflot Flight 3739, a Tupolev Tu-104, crashes on takeoff from Irkutsk after the aircraft rolled to the right, killing 24 of 114 on board.
 March 6 – Aeroflot Flight 909, an Ilyushin Il-18, crashes near Voronezh due to loss of control following an electrical failure, killing all 111 on board.
 April 27 – American Airlines Flight 625, a Boeing 727, crashes on approach to St. Thomas, Virgin Islands, killing 37 of 88 people on board.
 May 15 – Aeroflot Flight 1802, an Antonov An-24, crashes near Viktorovka, Chernigov Region due to loss of control following an unexplained rudder deflection, killing all 52 on board.
 June 1 – Aeroflot Flight 418, a Tupolev Tu-154, crashes into a mountainside on the island of Bioko in Equatorial Guinea for reasons unknown; all 46 on board die.
 June 4 – Air Manila Flight 702, a Lockheed L-188 Electra, crashes shortly after takeoff from NAS Agana, Guam due to engine failure and pilot error, killing all 45 on board; one person on the ground also dies when a car is struck by the aircraft.
 June 6 – In the 1976 Sabah Air GAF Nomad crash, a GAF N-22B Nomad crashes into the sea on approach into Kota Kinabalu International Airport, Malaysia. All 11 passengers and crew are killed. Several local political leaders were on board at the time.
 June 27 – Air France Flight 139, an Airbus A300, is hijacked from Athens by two Palestinians and two Germans who divert the flight to Libya and then to Uganda, where the plane is met by pro-Palestinian forces from Idi Amin's government; Israeli troops eventually storm the airport in Operation Entebbe, killing hijackers and Ugandan soldiers and freeing all but three of the hostages; Israeli colonel Yonatan Netanyahu, brother of Benjamin Netanyahu, is also killed in the raid.
 July 28 – ČSA Flight 001, an Ilyushin Il-18, crashes near Bratislava in Czechoslovakia, killing 76 of 78 people on board.
 August 15 – SAETA Flight 232, a Vickers Viscount 785D, goes missing mid-route from Quito to Cuenca, Ecuador; all four crew members and 55 passengers are killed, but the scene remains undiscovered for 26 years until October 2002, when climbers on the eastern face of the stratovolcano Chimborazo come upon the site.
 September 9 – In the 1976 Anapa mid-air collision, Aeroflot Flight 7957, an Antonov An-24, collides with Aeroflot Flight C-31, a Yakovlev Yak-40, over the Black Sea off Anapa due to ATC and crew errors, killing all 70 on board both aircraft.
 September 10 – 1976 Zagreb mid-air collision between British Airways Flight 476, a Hawker Siddeley Trident, and Inex-Adria Aviopromet Flight 550, a McDonnell Douglas DC-9, near Zagreb, Yugoslavia, kills all 176 people on board both aircraft.
 September 19 – Turkish Airlines Flight 452, a Boeing 727, crashes into a hillside near Karatepe, Turkey, while on approach to Antalya Airport; all 154 passengers and crew die.
 October 6 – Cubana de Aviación Flight 455, a Douglas DC-8, is bombed by anti-Castro militants and crashes near Bridgetown, Barbados, killing all 73 people on board.
 October 12 – Indian Airlines Flight 171, a Sud Caravelle, crashes while attempting an emergency landing at Bombay Airport; all 95 passengers and crew on board are killed.
 November 23 – Olympic Airways Flight 830, a NAMC YS-11A, crashes into a mountain in Greece in low visibility, killing all 50 on board.
 November 28 – Aeroflot Flight 2415, a Tupolev Tu-104, crashes shortly after takeoff from Sheremetyevo International Airport due to crew disorientation following artificial horizon failure, killing all 73 on board.
 December 17 – Aeroflot Flight N-36, an Antonov An-24, crashes on approach to Kiev-Zhuilany Airport, killing 48 of 55 on board.
 December 25 – EgyptAir Flight 864, a Boeing 707, crashes into an industrial complex near Bangkok, Thailand, due to pilot error; all 52 on board are killed as well as another 19 on the ground.

1977 

 January 13 – Aeroflot Flight 3843, a Tupolev Tu-104 operating a flight from Khabarovsk Novy Airport, Soviet Union, to Almaty Airport in Kazakhstan, crashes in a field just short of its destination due to an engine fire; all 90 people on board are killed.
 January 15 – Linjeflyg Flight 618, a Skyline Vickers Viscount 838 operating a multi-leg domestic flight in Sweden, crashes in the district of Kälvesta, western Stockholm, due to atmospheric icing, killing all 22 people on board.
 February 15 – Aeroflot Flight 5003, an Ilyushin Il-18 operating a domestic flight in the western Soviet Union, crashes due to pilot error after a missed approach to Mineralnye Vody Airport, killing 77 of the 98 people on board.
 March 27 – In the Tenerife airport disaster, two Boeing 747s, KLM Flight 4805 and Pan Am Flight 1736, collide on the runway at Los Rodeos Airport in heavy fog; 583 of the 644 people on board the two aircraft are killed in the deadliest accident in the history of commercial aviation.
 April 4 – Southern Airways Flight 242, a McDonnell Douglas DC-9 flying from northwest Alabama to Atlanta, Georgia, crash lands on a highway near New Hope, Georgia, after encountering dual engine failure in a thunderstorm; 63 of the 85 people on board are killed, as well as nine on the ground.
 April 12 – Delta Air Lines Flight 1080, a Lockheed L-1011 Tristar operating a domestic flight in California, United States, experiences a loss of pitch control during takeoff from Los Angeles International Airport due to a malfunctioning elevator; the aircraft is able to land safely with no casualties.
 April 27 – An Aviateca Convair 240 crashes shortly after taking off from La Aurora International Airport, Guatemala City, Guatemala, in Central America, due to a maintenance error; all 28 people on board survived.
 May 14 – A Dan-Air Boeing 707 crashes near Lusaka Airport, Zambia, at the conclusion of a multi-leg flight from London's Heathrow Airport, via Athens and Nairobi, due to structural failure; the one passenger and five crew members are killed.
 May 27 – Aeroflot Flight 331, an Ilyushin Il-62 operating a multi-leg flight from Moscow, Soviet Union, to Havana, Cuba, crashes due to pilot error while on approach to its destination, José Martí International Airport, killing all but two of the 70 people on board, plus one person on the ground.
 July 20 – Aeroflot Flight B-2, an Avia 14, crashes shortly after takeoff from Vitim Airport, Russia due to pilot and ATC errors; of the 50 on board, only a passenger survives.
 September 27 – Japan Airlines Flight 715, a McDonnell Douglas DC-8 operating a multi-leg flight from Tokyo to Singapore, crashes into a hillside while on approach to Sultan Abdul Aziz Shah Airport in Malaysia due to pilot error, killing 34 of the 79 people on board.
 September 28 – Japan Airlines Flight 472, a McDonnell Douglas DC-8 bound for Tokyo, is hijacked by Japanese Red Army (JRA) militants shortly after departing from Bombay, India, and forced to land in Dhaka, Bangladesh; the hijackers' demands are eventually met and all 151 passengers and crew are released unharmed.
 October 13 – Lufthansa Flight 181, a Boeing 737 flying from Mallorca to Germany, is hijacked over the Mediterranean Sea by members of the PFLP (a Palestinian revolutionary organization) who murder the pilot; the aircraft eventually lands in Mogadishu where it is stormed by German police commandos; three of the hijackers are killed, the fourth is captured, and there are no other fatalities.
 October 20 – A Convair CV-240 chartered by Lynyrd Skynyrd crashes into a heavily wooded swamp in Amite County, Mississippi, United States, while en route from Greenville, South Carolina, to Baton Rouge, Louisiana, due to fuel exhaustion; four of the 24 passengers and both crew members are killed.
 November 19 – TAP Portugal Flight 425, a Boeing 727 operating a multi-leg flight from Belgium to Portugal, plunges over a steep bank and bursts into flames after overshooting the runway at Madeira Airport due to pilot error, killing 131 of the 164 people on board.
 December 2 – A Libyan Arab Airlines Tupolev Tu-154 crashes near Benghazi, Libya, due to fuel exhaustion, while en route from King Abdulaziz International Airport, Saudi Arabia, to Benina International Airport in Libya; 59 of the 165 people on board lose their lives.
 December 4 – Malaysian Airline System Flight 653, a Boeing 737 operating a flight from Penang to Kuala Lumpur, Malaysia, crashes into a swamp near Tanjung Kupang, Johor, as a result of a failed hijacking attempt; all 100 people on board are killed.
 December 13 – Air Indiana Flight 216, a Douglas DC-3 carrying the Purple Aces basketball team on a charter flight from Evansville, Indiana, to Nashville, Tennessee, crashes shortly after take-off due to overloading and pilot error, killing all 29 passengers and crew.
 December 18 – United Airlines Flight 2860, a McDonnell Douglas DC-8 flying from San Francisco, California, to Chicago, Illinois, in the United States, crashes in the Wasatch mountain range in Utah, killing the three crew on board.
 December 18 – SA de Transport Aérien Flight 730, a Sud Aviation SE-210 Caravelle operating a flight from Geneva, Switzerland, to Madeira, Portugal, crashes into the sea while on final approach to its destination due to pilot error, killing 36 of the 57 people on board.

1978 

 January 1 – Air India Flight 855, a Boeing 747, crashes into the Arabian Sea as a result of instrument malfunction and pilot error, killing all 213 passengers and crew on board.
 February 11 – Pacific Western Airlines Flight 314, a Boeing 737-200, from Edmonton crashes at Cranbrook Airport after one thrust reverser did not fully stow following an aborted landing, killing 42 of the 49 people on board.
 March 1 – Continental Airlines Flight 603, a McDonnell Douglas DC-10, crashes on takeoff from Los Angeles International Airport after a tire blows on the left main landing gear, causing it to collapse; of 200 on board, two die at the time and two others die of their injuries three months later.
 March 3 – A Línea Aeropostal Venezolana Hawker Siddeley HS 748 crashes on departure from Simón Bolívar International Airport, Venezuela due to possible instrument failure; all 46 on board are killed.
 March 16 – In the 1978 Balkan Bulgarian Tupolev Tu-134 crash, a Tupolev Tu-134 crashes near the village of Gabare, Bulgaria, killing all 73 people on board.
 April 20 – Korean Air Lines Flight 902, a Boeing 707, is shot down by Soviet fighter planes; the plane crash-lands near the Soviet Union's border with Finland; two of the 109 people on board are killed, the rest are subsequently released.
 May 8 – National Airlines Flight 193, a Boeing 727, lands short on approach to Pensacola, Florida, United States, in Escambia Bay, as a result of pilot error; three passengers out of 58 people on board drown.
 May 19 – Aeroflot Flight 6709, a Tupolev Tu-154, crashes in a field near Maksatikha, Russia after all three engines failed due to fuel starvation, killing four of 134 on board.
 June 26 – Air Canada Flight 189, a McDonnell Douglas DC-9, crashes on takeoff in Toronto, Ontario, Canada, because of tire failure; Two of the 107 passengers and crew on board die.
 June 26 – Helikopter Service Flight 165, a Sikorsky S-61, crashes into the North Sea while en route to Statfjord oil field due to fatigue failure of a rotor, killing all 18 on board.
 August 9 – Olympic Airways Flight 411, a Boeing 747-200, nearly crashes in downtown Athens following an uncontained engine failure during take-off. The plane regains enough speed to safely return to Ellinikon International Airport and none of the 418 passengers or crew suffer serious injury.
 August 30 – In the LOT Polish Airlines Flight 165 hijacking, two East German citizens hijack a Tupolev Tu-134, and force it to land at Tempelhof Airport; there are no casualties to the 63 passengers on board.
 September 3 – Air Rhodesia Flight 825 from Kariba to Salisbury is shot down by a SA-7 surface-to-air missile; 18 of the 56 passengers initially survive the emergency landing, 10 are subsequently killed by Zimbabwe People's Revolutionary Army (ZIPRA) militants.
 September 25 – Pacific Southwest Airlines Flight 182, a Boeing 727, collides with a Cessna 172 over San Diego, California, United States; all 135 aboard the airliner, both pilots of the Cessna, and seven people on the ground are killed, making this the worst aviation disaster in California history, and the deadliest mid-air collision in North America.
 October 7 – Aeroflot Flight 1080, a Yakovlev Yak-40, crashes shortly after takeoff from Koltsovo Airport due to engine failure caused by ice ingestion, killing all 38 on board.
 November 15 – Icelandic Airlines Flight 001, a Douglas DC-8 on a charter flight, crashes into a coconut plantation while on approach to Katunayake, Sri Lanka, for a refueling stop; 183 out of 262 people on board are killed.
 December 23 – Alitalia Flight 4128, a McDonnell Douglas DC-9-32, crashes into the Tyrrhenian Sea when on approach to Palermo International Airport in Palermo, Italy. Of the 129 passengers and crew, 108 die.
 December 28 – United Airlines Flight 173, a Douglas DC-8, runs out of fuel while circling near Portland, Oregon, United States, as the crew investigates a light indicating a problem with the landing gear; the plane crashes in a suburban area damaging two unoccupied houses, killing 10 and injuring 24 of the 181 on board.

1979 
 January 30 – Varig Flight 967, a Boeing 707 bound for Rio de Janeiro–Galeão International Airport, disappears over the Pacific Ocean  after takeoff from Narita International Airport; the cause for the disappearance remains unknown, as neither survivors (six-man flight crew) nor wreckage have ever been found.
 February 12 – Air Rhodesia Flight 827, a Vickers Viscount on a flight between Kariba and Salisbury, is shot down by Zimbabwe People's Revolutionary Army militants using a SA-7 (Strela 2) surface-to-air missile shortly after takeoff in similar circumstances to Flight 825 five months earlier; all 55 passengers and four crew are killed.
 February 17 – Air New Zealand Flight 4374, a Fokker F-27 Friendship crashes while on approach into Auckland International Airport, New Zealand. The captain and one passenger are killed.
 March 13 – Alia Royal Jordanian Airlines Flight 600, a Boeing 727 crashes following a missed approach at Doha International Airport, Qatar; 44 of the 64 on board are killed.
 March 17 – Aeroflot Flight 1691, a Tupolev Tu-104, crashes near Vnukovo International Airport while attempting to make an emergency landing after a fire alarm is reported, killing 58 of 119 on board.
 March 29 – Quebecair Flight 255, a Fairchild F-27 bound for Montreal, crashes minutes after takeoff from Quebec City as it was attempting to return to the airport following the explosion of its number 2 engine, killing 17 of the 24 people on board.
 April 23 – SAETA Flight 011, a Vickers Viscount, crashes in a mountainous region of Pastaza, Ecuador, killing all 57 people on board.
 May 25 – American Airlines Flight 191, a McDonnell Douglas DC-10, crashes upon takeoff from O'Hare International Airport after its left engine detaches from the wing, killing all 271 on board and two on the ground in the worst single-aircraft accident on U.S. soil.
 May 30 – Downeast Flight 46, a de Havilland Canada DHC-6 Twin Otter, crashes on approach into Knox County Regional Airport, Maine. 17 of the 18 passengers and crew are killed.
 June 17 – Air New England Flight 248, a de Havilland Canada DHC-6 Twin Otter, crashes near Camp Greenough, Massachusetts, while on approach to Barnstable Municipal Airport, killing the pilot.
 June 20 – American Airlines Flight 293, a Boeing 727, is hijacked shortly before it lands in Chicago. After letting the passengers and most of the crew members go, the hijacker forces the remaining crew members to fly back to New York City, where he demands and receives a Boeing 707 to fly him initially to Johannesburg, South Africa, but later to Ireland. After arriving at Shannon Airport, he surrenders to the Irish authorities.
 July 11 – A Garuda Indonesia Fokker F28 strikes a volcano on approach to Medan Airport, Indonesia, killing all 61 on board.
 July 26 – Lufthansa Cargo Flight 527, a Boeing 707, crashes into a slope shortly after takeoff from Rio de Janeiro, Brazil, killing all 3 crew members on board.
 July 31 – Dan-Air Flight 0034, a Hawker Siddeley HS 748, fails to become airborne at Sumburgh Airport, Scotland, due to a maintenance error, killing 17 of 44 on board.
 August 11 – The 1979 Dniprodzerzhynsk mid-air collision between two Aeroflot Tupolev Tu-134s kills 178.
 August 29 – Aeroflot Flight 5484, a Tupolev Tu-124, breaks up in mid-air after experiencing loss of control due to unexplained release of the flaps, killing all 63 people aboard.
 September 14 – Aero Trasporti Italiani Flight 12, a Douglas DC-9, crashes into a rocky mountainside during an attempted landing at Cagliari-Elmas Airport, Italy, killing all 31 people on board.
 October 7 – Swissair Flight 316, a Douglas DC-8-62 crashes after overrunning the runway at Athens-Ellinikon International Airport, killing 14 of the 154 passengers and crew on board.
 October 31 – Western Airlines Flight 2605, a McDonnell Douglas DC-10, strikes a vehicle on a closed runway in dense fog at Mexico City, Mexico; 72 die.
 November 15 – American Airlines Flight 444, a Boeing 727, takes off with a bomb planted in the cargo hold by the Unabomber. The bomb fails to detonate, giving off large quantities of smoke. Twelve passengers are treated for smoke inhalation, but all 78 on board survive.
 November 26 – Pakistan International Airlines Flight 740, a Boeing 707, crashes after a fire in the cabin in Jeddah, Saudi Arabia; all 145 passengers and 11 crew die.
 November 28 – Air New Zealand Flight 901, a McDonnell Douglas DC-10, collides with Mount Erebus, Antarctica, during a sightseeing flight, killing all 257 people on board; this crash is also known as the Mount Erebus Disaster.
 December 23 – A Turkish Airlines Fokker F28 crashes into a hillside near Kuyumcuköy, Ankara, Turkey, while on approach to Esenboğa Airport; of the 45 on board, only four survive.

1980s

1980 

 January 21 – Iran Air Flight 291, a Boeing 727, crashes into the Alborz Mountains near Tehran, Iran, amid a snowstorm on approach to Mehrabad International Airport; killing all 128 people on board.
 February 21 – Advance Airlines Flight 4210, a Beechcraft Super King Air 200, crashes shortly after takeoff from Sydney Airport, following failure of one engine due to water in the fuel, killing all 13 people on board.
 March 14 – LOT Polish Airlines Flight 007, an Ilyushin Il-62, crashes near Warsaw, Poland, after the No. 2 engine disintegrates and severs the elevator and rudder control lines; all 87 on board are killed.
 April 12 – Transbrasil Flight 303, a Boeing 727, crashes into a hill near Florianópolis, Brazil, killing 55 of 58 on board.
 April 25 – Dan-Air Flight 1008, a Boeing 727, crashes into a mountain near Tenerife, Spain, killing all 138 passengers and eight crew on board.
 April 27 – Thai Airways Flight 231, a Hawker Siddeley HS 748, crashes while on approach to Don Mueang International Airport, Bangkok, Thailand, in severe weather, killing 44 of 53 on board.
 June 20 – Air Wisconsin Flight 965, a Swearingen Metro II, crashes after a catastrophic engine failure in poor weather en route to Lincoln Municipal Airport, Nebraska. 13 of the 15 passengers and crew are killed.
 June 27 – Itavia Flight 870, a McDonnell Douglas DC-9, crashes into the Tyrrhenian Sea near Italy, killing all 81 people on board.
 July 8 – Aeroflot Flight 4225, a Tupolev Tu-154, crashes shortly after takeoff from Almaty International Airport, killing all 166 people on board.
 August 19 – Saudia Flight 163, a Lockheed L-1011 Tristar, lands at King Khalid International Airport in Riyadh, Saudi Arabia, when a fire breaks out on board; the evacuation of the plane is delayed and all 301 on board die.
 September 12 – In the Florida Commuter Airlines crash, a Douglas DC-3 ditches into the Atlantic Ocean near the Bahamas, killing all 34 on board.
 November 3 – In the Latin Carga Convair CV-880 crash, a Convair CV-880 crashes shortly after taking off from Caracas Airport, Venezuela. All four crew members are killed.
 November 19 – Korean Air Flight 015, a Boeing 747, crashes on landing at Gimpo International Airport. 15 of the 226 passengers and crew on board are killed.
 December 22 – Saudia Flight 162, a Lockheed L-1011 Tristar, suffers an explosive decompression over Qatar, killing two passengers who are blown out of the aircraft; the cause is traced to a fatigue failure of a main landing gear wheel flange.

1981 
 March 2 – Pakistan International Airlines Flight 326, a Boeing 720, is hijacked by the militant insurgency group Al-Zulfiqar in thirteen days. One passenger is killed amongst 144 people on board.
 March 28 – Garuda Indonesia Flight 206, a Douglas DC-9, is hijacked by Komando Jihad, the pilot is killed; all others survive.
 May 2 – Aer Lingus Flight 164, a Boeing 737, is hijacked while on approach to London Heathrow Airport. The hijacker demands to be taken to Iran. The plane lands at Le Touquet – Côte d'Opale Airport. After a nearly 10-hour stand-off, the hijacker is arrested. All 108 people survive.
 May 7 – Austral Líneas Aéreas Flight 901, a BAC One-Eleven, crashes near Aeroparque Jorge Newbery after losing control in a thunderstorm, killing all 31 on board.
 June 14 – Aeroflot Flight 498, an Ilyushin Il-14, crashes into a mountain on the Holy Nose Peninsula in Lake Baikal due to crew error, killing all 48 on board.
 June 26 – Dan-Air Flight 240, a Hawker Siddeley HS 748, crashes near Nailstone, Leicestershire, due to failure of the baggage door, causing rapid decompression and loss of control; all three crew on board die.
 July 18 – A Soviet Air Defence Forces Sukhoi SU-15 collides with an Argentine Canadair CL-44 operating an international cargo flight between Iran and Cyprus; the SU-15 pilot ejects and survives the incident, but all four occupants of the CL-44 are killed.
 July 20 – Somali Airlines Flight 40, a Fokker F27 Friendship, crashes shortly after takeoff from Mogadishu International Airport. All 50 passengers and crew on board are killed.
 July 27 – Aeromexico Flight 230, a DC-9, makes a hard landing at Chihuahua Airport, breaks up and a fire breaks out, killing 32 of the 66 people on board.
 August 13 – In the G-ASWI North Sea ditching, a Bristow Helicopters Westland Wessex suffers engine failure and ditches in the North Sea, killing all 13 on board.
 August 22 – Far Eastern Air Transport Flight 103, a Boeing 737, disintegrates during flight and crashes near Taipei, Taiwan; severe corrosion in the fuselage structure leads to explosive decompression and disintegration at high altitude; all 110 on board are killed.
 August 24 – Aeroflot Flight 811, an Antonov An-24, collides in mid-air with a Soviet Air Force Tupolev Tu-16 over the Zavitinsky District, Russia, killing 31 of 32 on board the An-24 and all six on board the Tu-16.
 August 26 – Aeropesca Colombia Flight 221, a Vickers Viscount, flies into Mount Santa Elena, killing all 50 people on board.
 September 18 – In the 1981 Zheleznogorsk mid-air collision, a Yakovlev Yak-40 collides with a Mil Mi-8 helicopter, both operated by Aeroflot, near Zheleznogorsk-Ilimskiy Airport due to ATC errors, killing all 40 occupants on both aircraft.
 September 22 – Eastern Air Lines Flight 935, a Lockheed L-1011 TriStar, makes an emergency landing after engine No. 2 explodes severing 3 out of 4 hydraulic lines, all 201 occupants on board survive.
 September 29 – Indian Airlines Flight 423, a Boeing 737 operating a domestic flight from Delhi to Amritsar in India, is hijacked by Sikh extremists and forced to land in Lahore, Pakistan, where special forces storm the aircraft; there are no fatalities.
 October 6 – NLM CityHopper Flight 431, a Fokker F28 Fellowship, is destroyed in flight by a tornado near Rotterdam, killing all 17 people on board.
 November 8 – Aeroméxico Flight 110, a Douglas DC-9, suffers a cabin decompression and crashes near Zihuatanejo while attempting to make an emergency landing at Acapulco International Airport, killing all 18 on board.
 November 17 – Aeroflot Flight 3603, a Tupolev Tu-154, crashes while attempting to land at Noril'sk Airport due to crew error and CFIT, killing 99 of the 167 passengers and crew on board.
 December 1 – Inex-Adria Aviopromet Flight 1308, a McDonnell Douglas MD-81, crashes in the mountains while approaching Campo dell'Oro Airport in Ajaccio, Corsica, killing all 180 on board.

1982 

 January 13 – Air Florida Flight 90, a Boeing 737, crashes into the frozen Potomac River after takeoff from Washington National Airport, Virginia, United States; five on board survive; 74 on board and four on the ground die, including one initial survivor who dies after ensuring that the other crash survivors are rescued from the frozen river.
 January 23 – World Airways Flight 30H, a McDonnell Douglas DC-10, overshoots the runway at Boston, Massachusetts, United States; two passengers are reported missing when part of the plane plunged into Boston Harbor and are presumed to have drowned.
 February 9 – Japan Airlines Flight 350, a Douglas DC-8-61, crashes on approach to Tokyo International Airport (Haneda), Japan; of the 166 passengers and eight crew, 24 passengers are killed.
 February 21 – Pilgrim Airlines Flight 458, a de Havilland Canada DHC-6-100, makes a forced landing on the frozen Scituate Reservoir near Providence, Rhode Island after a fire erupts in the cockpit and cabin. One passenger is killed, and eight of the remaining nine passengers, as well as both crew members, receive serious injuries.
 March 11 – Widerøe Flight 933, a de Havilland Canada Twin Otter, crashes into the Barents Sea near Mehamn, killing all 15 on board; this accident sparked conspiracy theories in Norway.
 March 20 – In the 1982 Garuda Fokker F28 crash, the Fokker F28 overruns the runway in bad weather at Tanjung Karang-Branti Airport; all 27 are killed when the aircraft bursts into flames.
 March 26 – Aeropesca Colombia Flight 217, a Vickers Viscount, hits a mountain in Colombia; all 21 on board are killed.
 April 26 – CAAC Flight 3303, a Hawker Siddeley Trident, crashes into a mountain near Yangsuo while on approach to Guilin Liangjiang International Airport, China, in heavy weather; all 112 on board die.
 June 8 – VASP Flight 168, a Boeing 727, crashes into a hillside in Brazil, killing all 137 on board.
 June 12 – A TABA Fairchild FH-227 crashes at Tabatinga Airport, Brazil; all 44 on board are killed.
 June 21 – Air India Flight 403, a Boeing 707, crashes at Sahar International Airport in Bombay, India, while landing during a heavy rainstorm; 15 of 99 passengers and two of 12 crew are killed.
 June 24 – British Airways Flight 009, a Boeing 747-200, flies through a cloud of volcanic ash south of Java; all engines fail in flight, forcing the plane to glide; the crew is able to restart the engines and make a safe landing.
 June 28 – Aeroflot Flight 8641, a Yakovlev Yak-42, breaks up in mid-air and crashes near Mozyr, Belarus due to a failure in the jackscrew mechanism caused by metal fatigue, killing all 132 on board in the first loss of and the deadliest accident involving the Yak-42. The crash remains the worst in Belarus.
 July 6 – Aeroflot Flight 411, an Ilyushin Il-62, crashes after takeoff from Sheremetyevo International Airport; all 90 on board are killed.
 July 9 – Pan Am Flight 759, a Boeing 727, crashes in Kenner, Louisiana, United States, shortly after takeoff; all 145 on board and eight people on the ground are killed.
 August 11 – Pan Am Flight 830, a bomb placed under a seat cushion explodes aboard a Boeing 747-100 flying from Tokyo, Japan to Honolulu, Hawaii, killing one passenger. The plane makes an emergency landing in Honolulu.
 September 1 – An Aerolíneas Cóndor de Havilland Canada DHC-4 Caribou flies into high ground in the Andes, Ecuador; all 44 on board are killed.
 September 13 – Spantax Flight 995, a McDonnell Douglas DC-10, is destroyed by a fire after an aborted takeoff at Málaga Airport, Spain; 50 of the 294 on board die.
 September 29 – Aeroflot Flight 343, an Ilyushin Il-62, veers off the runway while landing at Luxembourg Findel Airport, killing seven of 77 on board.
 December 9 – Aeronor Flight 304, a Fairchild F-27, crashes near La Florida Airport, Chile; all 46 on board are killed.
 December 24 – CAAC Flight 2311, an Ilyushin Il-18, catches fire before landing at Baiyun Airport in Guangzhou, China, resulting 25 deaths of 69 on board though it successfully lands on the runway.

1983 

 January 11 – United Airlines Flight 2885, a Douglas DC-8-54F, crashes shortly after taking off from Detroit Metropolitan Wayne County Airport, Michigan. All three crew members are killed.
 January 16 – Turkish Airlines Flight 158, a Boeing 727, lands about  short of the runway at Ankara Esenboğa Airport, Turkey, in driving snow, breaks up and catches fire; 47 passengers are killed, all seven crew and 13 passengers survive the accident with injuries.
 March 11 – In the 1983 Avensa Douglas DC-9 crash, a Douglas DC-9 crashes at Barquisimeto Airport, Venezuela, killing 22 passengers and one crew member.
 May 5 – Eastern Air Lines Flight 855, a Lockheed L-1011 Tristar, loses power from all engines 30 minutes after takeoff from Miami International Airport; the pilot is able to return to Miami after restarting one engine; no casualties are reported on board.
 June 2 – Air Canada Flight 797, a McDonnell Douglas DC-9, catches fire during flight over Kentucky; 23 of 46 passengers die from smoke inhalation even after the crew successfully lands the aircraft at the Cincinnati airport in northern Kentucky.
 June 8 – Reeve Aleutian Airways Flight 8,  Lockheed L-188C Electra; one of the propellers broke away from its engine and struck the fuselage, damaging the flight controls.  The pilots were able to make a successful emergency landing.
 July 1 – A Chosonminhang Ilyushin Il-62 crashes in mountainous terrain near Labé, Guinea, killing all 23 on board.
 July 11 – A TAME Boeing 737-200 crashes into a hill near Cuenca, Ecuador, killing all 119 on board.
 July 16 – A British Airways Sikorsky S-61 helicopter crashes into the sea off the Isles of Scilly; 20 of 26 people on board die, in the worst helicopter accident in the United Kingdom to date and results in a review of helicopter safety.
 July 23 – Air Canada Flight 143, a Boeing 767, runs out of fuel above Manitoba because of a miscalculation; the crew successfully glides the aircraft to a safe landing at a former Air Force base (and current drag strip) at Gimli, Manitoba; the aircraft becomes known as the Gimli Glider.
 August 30 – Aeroflot Flight 5463, a Tupolev Tu-134A, crashes into a mountain while approaching Alma-Ata Airport, killing all 90 on board.
 September 1 – Korean Air Lines Flight 007, a Boeing 747, is shot down by Soviet fighter planes near Sakhalin and Moneron Island after straying into Soviet airspace; all 269 people on board are killed.
 September 14 – In the 1983 Guilin Airport collision, a PLAAF Harbin H-5 bomber collides with a CAAC Hawker Siddeley Trident 2E as it taxies for takeoff at Guilin Qifengling Airport, China. 11 of the 106 occupants aboard the Trident are killed. It is unknown how many casualties, if any, occurred aboard the Harbin H-5.
 September 23 – Gulf Air Flight 771, a Boeing 737, crashes near Mina Jebel Ali, United Arab Emirates, after a bomb planted by the Abu Nidal Organization detonates on board; all 112 people on board die.
 October 11 – Air Illinois Flight 710, a Hawker Siddeley HS 748, crashes near Pinckneyville, Illinois, due to electrical problems. All 10 passengers and crew on board are killed.
 November 8 – TAAG Angola Airlines Flight 462, a Boeing 737-200, is shot down just after takeoff from Lubango Airport; all 130 on board die.
 November 18 – Aeroflot Flight 6833, a Tupolev Tu-134, is hijacked by seven Georgians attempting to defect from the Soviet Union; the aircraft is stormed by Alpha Group who arrest four hijackers; three are executed while the fourth receives a jail sentence; of the 71 on board (including the hijackers), eight die; the aircraft is written off.
 November 27 – Avianca Flight 011, a Boeing 747, strikes a hill because of a navigational error while attempting to land in Madrid, Spain; of the 192 passengers and crew aboard, 11 survive.
 December 7 – In the Madrid runway disaster, Iberia Flight 350, a Boeing 727, collides with Aviaco Flight 134, a McDonnell Douglas DC-9, on a runway at Madrid–Barajas Airport; 51 people aboard the Boeing 727 and all 42 people aboard the DC-9 are killed.
 December 18 – Malaysian Airline System Flight 684, an Airbus A300 crashes at Kuala Lumpur Airport in Malaysia. There are no fatalities of the 247 people on board.
 December 20 – Ozark Air Lines Flight 650, a McDonnell Douglas DC-9, collides with a snow plow in Sioux Falls, South Dakota; all on board survive, however the driver of the snow plow is killed.
 December 23 – In the 1983 Anchorage runway collision, Korean Air Lines Flight 084, a McDonnell Douglas DC-10, collides with SouthCentral Air Flight 59, a Piper PA-31-350, on a runway at Anchorage International Airport; all 12 occupants on both aircraft survive.
 December 24 – Aeroflot Flight 601, an Antonov An-24, crashes on approach to Leshukonskoye Airport due to pilot error, killing 44 of 49 on board.

1984 
 January 10 – A Balkan Bulgarian Tupolev Tu-134 crashed into a forest near Sofia, Bulgaria, during a snowstorm killing all 50 people on board.
 February 28 – Scandinavian Airlines System Flight 901, a McDonnell Douglas DC-10, crashes into a ditch after overshooting the runway at John F. Kennedy Airport, New York, due to pilot error; all 177 passengers and crew on board survive the incident.
 March 22 – Pacific Western Airlines Flight 501, a Boeing 737, suffers an uncontained engine failure during takeoff from Calgary; all passengers and crew are safely evacuated, but the plane burns to the ground.
 July 5 – Indian Airlines Flight 405, nine Sikhs belonging to the Khalistan movement forced an Airbus A300 on a domestic flight from Srinagar to the Delhi with 254 passengers and 10 crew on board, to be flown to Lahore Airport in Pakistan. The demands (release of prisoners and money) of the hijackers were not met and they ultimately surrendered to Pakistani authorities on July 6.
 August 5 – A Biman Bangladesh Airlines Fokker F27-600 crashed into a marsh near Zia International Airport in Dhaka, Bangladesh while landing in poor weather. With a total death toll of 49 people, it is the deadliest aviation disaster to occur on Bangladeshi soil.
 August 24 – Indian Airlines Flight 421, seven Sikh hijackers demanded an Indian Airlines Boeing 737 flying from Delhi to Srinagar be flown to the United Arab Emirates. The plane was taken to the UAE where the defense minister of UAE negotiated the release of the passengers. It was related to the Sikh secessionist struggle in the Indian state of Punjab.
 August 30 – Cameroon Airlines Flight 786, a Boeing 737, with 109 passengers and seven crew on board, suffers an uncontained engine failure during taxi for takeoff at the Douala, Cameroon airport, starting a fire; two people die as the plane burns to the ground.
 September 18 – Aeroservicios Ecuatorianos Flight 767-103, a Douglas DC-8-55F crashes after failing to get airborne at Quito's Mariscal Sucre International Airport, Ecuador. All four crew, as well as 49 on the ground, are killed.
 October 11 – Aeroflot Flight 3352, a Tupolev Tu-154B, crashes on landing at Tsentralny Airport, Omsk, Russia, killing 174 passengers and four people on the ground.
 December 6 – Provincetown-Boston Airlines Flight 1039, an Embraer 110 Bandeirante with 13 passengers and crew on board, crashes on takeoff at Jacksonville, Florida, killing all aboard.
 December 23 – Aeroflot Flight 3519, a Tupolev Tu-154B, crashes at Krasnoyarsk Airport while attempting an emergency landing following an engine fire, killing 110 of 111 on board.

1985 

 January 1 – Eastern Air Lines Flight 980, a Boeing 727 en route from Paraguay to Florida, United States, impacts Mount Illimani in Bolivia while descending for a scheduled stopover at El Alto International Airport, killing all 29 people on board.
 January 21 – Galaxy Airlines Flight 203, a Lockheed L-188 Electra bound for Minneapolis, Minnesota, United States, crashes shortly after takeoff from Cannon International Airport in Reno, Nevada, due to an improperly secured air start access door; 70 of the 71 people on board are killed.
 February 19 – China Airlines Flight 006, a Boeing 747SP en route from Taoyuan International Airport, Taiwan, to Los Angeles in the United States, suffers an engine flameout off the coast of California and dives  before regaining control; the aircraft lands safely in San Francisco and all 274 occupants survive, with two passengers injured.
 February 19 – Iberia Flight 610, a Boeing 727 operating a domestic flight in Spain, crashes into a television broadcast antenna installed on the summit of Monte Oiz while approaching Bilbao Airport, killing all 141 passengers and seven crew on board.
 May 3 – Aeroflot Flight 8381, a Tupolev Tu-134 operating a domestic flight in the Soviet Union, collides with a Soviet Air Force Antonov An-26; both aircraft crash near Zolochev, Ukraine, killing all 94 people on board the two aircraft.
 June 14 – Trans World Airlines Flight 847, a Boeing 727 operating a multi-leg flight from Cairo, Egypt, to San Diego, California, United States, is hijacked by Lebanese militants shortly after taking off from Athens in Greece; one passenger is murdered during the three-day ordeal.
 June 21 – Braathens SAFE Flight 139, a Boeing 737 operating a domestic flight in Norway, is hijacked by a political activist who demands to speak to the Norwegian Prime Minister Kåre Willoch; all crew and passengers survive unharmed.
 June 23 – Air India Flight 182, a Boeing 747 en route from Montréal–Mirabel International Airport to London Heathrow Airport, is destroyed over the Atlantic Ocean off the southwest coast of Ireland by a bomb planted by Sikh extremists; all 329 people on board lose their lives.
 August 2 – Delta Air Lines Flight 191, a Lockheed L-1011 TriStar flying from Florida to California in the United States, crashes on approach to Dallas/Fort Worth International Airport after experiencing wind shear from a sudden microburst thunderstorm; 136 of the 163 people on board are killed, as well as a motorist whose car is struck by the aircraft.
 August 12 – Japan Airlines Flight 123, a Boeing 747 operating a domestic flight in Japan, crashes into Mount Takamagahara after suffering a rapid decompression that severs all hydraulic lines and renders the aircraft uncontrollable; with the loss of 520 of the 524 people on board, this is the deadliest single-aircraft disaster in history to date.
 August 22 – British Airtours Flight 28M, a Boeing 737 bound for Corfu International Airport, Greece, aborts its takeoff from Manchester Airport, England, because of an engine fire; 55 of the 137 on board are killed, mostly due to smoke inhalation.
 August 25 – Bar Harbor Airlines Flight 1808, a Beech 99 operating a domestic multi-leg flight from Boston, Massachusetts, to Bangor, Maine, crashes on approach to Auburn/Lewiston Municipal Airport, where it is about to make an unscheduled flag stop; all six passengers and two crew lose their lives.
 September 4 – A Bakhtar Afghan Airlines Antonov An-26 is shot down over Afghanistan by a ground-to-air missile, while operating a domestic flight from Kandahar to Farah; all 52 people on board are killed.
 September 6 – Midwest Express Airlines Flight 105, a McDonnell Douglas DC-9 bound for Atlanta, Georgia, crashes shortly after takeoff from Milwaukee Mitchell International Airport, Wisconsin, due to engine failure and pilot error, killing all 31 people on board.
 September 23 – Henson Airlines Flight 1517, a Beechcraft Model 99 operating a domestic flight from Maryland to Virginia in the United States, crashes on approach to Shenandoah Valley Regional Airport, killing all 14 passengers and crew on board.
 November 23 – EgyptAir Flight 648, a Boeing 737 operating a flight between Greece and Egypt, is hijacked by Palestinian militants and forced to land on the island of Malta where Egyptian Special Forces storm the aircraft; the incident kills 56 of the 89 passengers, two of the six crew members, and all but one of the hijackers.
 November 25 – An Aeroflot Antonov An-12 is shot down over Angola by a surface-to-air missile, while operating a cargo flight from Cuito Cuanavale to Luanda, allegedly by South African Special Forces; all 21 people on board are killed.
 December 12 – Arrow Air Flight 1285, a Douglas DC-8 operating a multi-leg charter flight from Cairo, Egypt, to Kentucky in the United States, crashes shortly after takeoff from Gander International Airport, Newfoundland, killing all 256 passengers and crew on board, making it the worst air disaster to occur on Canadian soil to date.
 December 19 – Aeroflot Flight 101/435, an Antonov An-24 operating a multi-leg domestic flight in the Soviet Union, is hijacked by the co-pilot and diverted to China; the aircraft lands safely at Qiqihar Airport in northeast China and all 51 on board are unharmed.

1986 

 January 18 – In the 1986 Aerovías Guatemala air crash, a Sud Aviation SE-210 Caravelle crashes into a hill on approach into Santa Elena Airport, Guatemala. All 94 passengers and crew on board are killed.
 January 28 – VASP Flight 210 runs off the end of the taxiway from which it mistakenly tried to take off from, and collides with an embankment, killing one passenger.
 March 31 – Mexicana de Aviación Flight 940, a Boeing 727, crashes into high ground near Santiago Maravatío, Mexico. All 167 passengers and crew are killed in the worst ever air disaster involving the Boeing 727.
 April 2 – TWA Flight 840, a Boeing 727, is bombed by Palestinian militants, killing four of the 121 people on board, the plane manages to land safely in Athens.
 May 3 – Air Lanka Flight 512, a Lockheed L-1011, is bombed by the Liberation Tigers of Tamil Eelam, killing 21 of 148 on board.
 May 3 – China Airlines Flight 334, a Boeing 747, is hijacked by the pilot, who subdues the two other crew members and changes heading to land in Guangzhou. All three on board survive.
 June 18 – Grand Canyon Airlines Flight 6, a De Havilland Canada DHC-6 Twin Otter, collides with a Bell 206 helicopter over the Tonto Plateau, killing all 25 on board both aircraft.
 July 2 – Aeroflot Flight 2306, a Tupolev Tu-134, crashes near Syktyvkar, Russia, while attempting an emergency landing following a fire in the cargo hold, killing 54 of 92 on board.
 August 3 – LIAT Flight 319, a DHC-6 Twin Otter crashes into the sea en route to E. T. Joshua Airport, St. Vincent and the Grenadines. All 13 passengers and crew are killed.
 August 31 – Aeroméxico Flight 498, a McDonnell Douglas DC-9, collides with a Piper Cherokee over Cerritos, California, killing all 67 people aboard both aircraft and 15 people on the ground.
 September 5 – Pan Am Flight 73, a Boeing 747, is hijacked on the ground at Jinnah International Airport in Karachi, Pakistan, by Palestinian militants. Twenty people die after a shootout occurs inside the plane.
 October 20 – Aeroflot Flight 6502, a Tupolev Tu-134, crashes in Kuybyshev (now Samara), Russia, due to pilot error, killing 70 of 94 people on board.
 November 6 – In the 1986 British International Helicopters Chinook crash, a Boeing 234LR Chinook crashes on approach to Sumburgh Airport, Shetland Islands; of 47 people on board, 45 die.
 December 12 – Aeroflot Flight 892, a Tupolev Tu-134A, crashes near Schonefeld Airport, East Berlin after the crew misunderstands instructions from ATC, killing 72 of 82 on board; two initially survive, but die later.
 December 25 – Iraqi Airways Flight 163, a Boeing 737, is hijacked by Hezbollah militants while en route to Amman, Jordan. A confrontation with security forces causes the plane to crash, killing 63 of the 106 people on board.

1987 

 January 3 – Varig Flight 797, a Boeing 707, crashes near Abidjan because of engine failure. Out of the 52 passengers and crew on board, there is only one survivor.
 January 15 – Skywest Airlines Flight 1834, a Swearingen Metro II, collides in mid-air with a private Mooney M-20 near Salt Lake City, killing all 10 on board both aircraft.
 January 16 – Aeroflot Flight 505, a Yakovlev Yak-40, crashes into the ground at Tashkent, Uzbekistan, after encountering a wake vortex from an Ilyushin Il-76 that had taken off one and a half minutes earlier, killing all nine on board.
 March 4 – Northwest Airlink Flight 2268, a CASA 212, crashes while attempting to land at Detroit Metropolitan Wayne County Airport in Detroit, Michigan, killing nine of the 19 passengers and crew on board.
 April 4 – Garuda Indonesia Flight 035, a Douglas DC-9, crashes while on approach to Medan Airport; 23 of 45 on board die.
 May 8 – American Eagle Flight 5452, a CASA C-212, crashes while landing at Mayagüez, Puerto Rico, due to maintenance issues and pilot error. All four passengers survive, both crew are killed.
 May 9 – LOT Polish Airlines Flight 5055, an Ilyushin Il-62M, crashes near Warsaw during landing because of engine failure. All 183 passengers and crew members die in the accident.
 May 19 – Air New Zealand Flight 24, Boeing 747-200, is hijacked on the tarmac at Nadi International Airport, Fiji, while making a scheduled refuelling stop. The hijacker boards the aircraft and demands the release of deposed Fijian prime minister Dr. Timoci Bavadra and his 27 ministers who are being held under house arrest. The flight crew eventually overpower the hijacker and hand him over to local police. There are no deaths or injuries reported.
 June 19 – Aeroflot Flight N-528, a Yakovlev Yak-40, overruns the runway on landing at Berdyansk, Ukraine, killing eight of 29 on board.
 June 27 – Philippine Airlines Flight 206, a Hawker Siddeley HS 748, crashes on the slopes of Mount Ugo, Benguet, as it begins its approach to Loakan Airport in Baguio City; all 50 passengers and crew are killed. Poor visibility is blamed for the crash.
 July 24 – Air Afrique Flight 056, a McDonnell Douglas DC-10-30, is hijacked and diverted to Geneva Airport, Switzerland, by a member of the Popular Front for the Liberation of Palestine. The hijacker kills one passenger and injures another flight attendant before being apprehended, while 29 people receive injuries during the evacuation.
 July 30 – In the 1987 Belize Air International C-97 Mexico City crash, a Boeing C-97G Stratofreighter crashes on to a highway shortly after taking off from Mexico City International Airport, Mexico. Five of the twelve passengers and crew are killed, as well as 44 on the ground.
 August 16 – Northwest Airlines Flight 255, a McDonnell Douglas MD-82, crashes on takeoff from Detroit as a result of pilot error. Of 155 people on board, there is only 1 survivor, four-year-old Cecelia Cichan. Two people in a car on the ground are also killed.
 August 31 – Thai Airways Flight 365, a Boeing 737, crashes into the ocean off the coast of Thailand as a result of pilot error. All 83 passengers and crew die.
 October 15 – Aero Trasporti Italiani Flight 460, an ATR 42-312, crashed into a mountain 15 minutes after takeoff due to pilot error. All 37 on board die.
 November 15 – Continental Airlines Flight 1713, a McDonnell Douglas DC-9, crashes on takeoff during a snowstorm at Denver's Stapleton International Airport, killing 25 passengers and three crew.
 November 28 – South African Airways Flight 295, a Boeing 747, crashes into the Indian Ocean after a fire in the cargo hold. All 159 aboard die.
 November 29 – Korean Air Flight 858, a Boeing 707, crashes into the Andaman Sea after a bomb explodes on board. All 115 people on board are killed.
 December 7 – Pacific Southwest Airlines Flight 1771, a BAe 146, is hijacked and deliberately crashes near Cayucos, California, by a disgruntled airline employee. All 43 people on board, including the hijacker, are killed.
 December 8 – In the 1987 Alianza Lima plane crash, a chartered Peruvian Navy Fokker F-27, crashes into the Pacific Ocean  from Jorge Chávez International Airport, whilst carrying the Peruvian football team Alianza Lima. Of the 44 people on board, only the pilot survive.
 December 13 – Philippine Airlines Flight 443, a Shorts 360–300, crashes into Mt. Gurain on the island of Mindanao. All 15 passengers and crew on board are killed.
 December 23 – Finnair Flight 915, a McDonnell Douglas DC-10, is the target of an attempted missile attack by the Soviet Union. The allegations come out in 2014 when Finnish media reports a claim by two of the flight's pilots that the missile explodes less than 30 seconds before impact. It causes outrage in Finland among those politicians and civil servants, to whom it should have been reported at the time.

1988 

 January 2 – Condor Flugdienst Flight 3782, a Boeing 737, crashes into a mountain near Seferihisar, Turkey, due to a navigation error, killing all 16 on board.
 January 18 – China Southwest Airlines Flight 4146, an Ilyushin Il-18, crashes while on approach to Chongqing Airport in China due to loss of control following an in-flight fire; all 108 on board die.
 January 18 – Aeroflot Flight 699, a Tupolev Tu-154, lands hard and crashes at Turkmenbashi International Airport due to pilot error, killing 11 of 146 on board.
 January 19 – Trans-Colorado Airlines Flight 2286, a Swearingen SA.227AC Metro III, crashes while on approach to Durango-La Plata Airport. Nine of the 17 passengers and crew on board are killed.
 February 8 – Nürnberger Flugdienst Flight 108, a Swearingen Metroliner III, crashes while en route to Düsseldorf Airport, Germany. The crew become disorientated after the aircraft is struck by lightning, leading to an uncontrollable spin. The aircraft disintegrates mid-air, resulting in the deaths of all 21 passengers and crew on board.
 February 19 – AVAir Flight 3378, a Swearingen Metroliner III, crashes on takeoff from Raleigh-Durham Airport due to pilot error, killing all 12 on board.
 March 4 – TAT Flight 230, a Fairchild FH-227, crashes near Fontainebleau, France, killing all 23 on board; an electrical problem is suspected.
 March 17 – Avianca Flight 410, a Boeing 727, crashes into terrain near Cúcuta, Colombia after takeoff as a result of pilot error. All 143 people on board die.
 April 5 – Kuwait Airways Flight 422, a Boeing 747, is hijacked en route from Bangkok to Kuwait by Lebanese guerillas demanding the release of Shi'ite prisoners held by Kuwait, leading to a hostage crisis lasting 16 days and encompassing three continents. The flight, initially forced to land at Mashhad in northeastern Iran, travels 3,200 miles to Larnaca, Cyprus and finally to Algiers. Two passengers are shot dead by the hijackers.  The remainder of the 112 passengers and crew, including three members of the Kuwaiti royal family, are eventually released and the hijackers allowed to leave Algeria.
 April 28 – Aloha Airlines Flight 243, a Boeing 737, suffers explosive decompression during flight but manages to land safely. Of 95 people on board, one flight attendant is blown out of the plane and killed, and several passengers are injured.
 May 6 – Widerøe Flight 710, a Dash 7, crashes in Torghatten, Norway, in thick fog, killing all 36 passengers in the worst-ever Dash 7 accident.
 May 24 – TACA Flight 110, a Boeing 737, suffers dual engine failure due to water ingestion; the aircraft lands safely at NASA's Michoud Assembly Facility in New Orleans; all on board survive.
 June 12 – Austral Líneas Aéreas Flight 46, a McDonnell Douglas DC-9, crashes short of the runway at Libertador General Jose de San Martin Airport, killing all 22 on board.
 June 26 – Air France Flight 296, an Airbus A320, makes a low pass over Mulhouse-Habsheim Airport in landing configuration during an air show and crashes into trees at the end of the runway. Of 130 passengers aboard, three die.
 July 3 – Iran Air Flight 655, an Airbus A300, is shot down over Iranian waters by the missile cruiser USS Vincennes; all 290 people on board are killed.
 July 13 – The 1988 British International Helicopters Sikorsky S-61N crash: a Sikorsky S-61 ditches in the North Sea due to an engine fire; all 21 on board survive.
 August 31 – CAAC Flight 301, a Hawker Siddeley Trident operating a Guangzhou Baiyun Airport to Hong Kong Kai Tak Airport flight, runs off the runway. Seven of the 89 passengers and crew on board are killed.
 August 31 – Delta Air Lines Flight 1141, a Boeing 727, crashes on takeoff from Dallas-Fort Worth International Airport as a result of pilot error and poor design Boeing's mechanical failsafe system on the 727; of 108 people on board, 12 passengers and two crew members are killed.
 September 9 – Vietnam Airlines Flight 831, a Tupolev Tu-134, crashes on approach to Don Mueang International Airport in Bangkok. 76 of the 90 passengers and crew on board are killed.
 September 15 – Ethiopian Airlines Flight 604, a Boeing 737, crashes on takeoff after suffering multiple bird strikes; 35 of 98 passengers die, all six crew survive.
 October 17 – Uganda Airlines Flight 775, a Boeing 707-338C, crashes while attempting to land at Rome's Fiumicino Airport; 33 of the 52 passengers and crew on board are killed.
 October 19 – Indian Airlines Flight 113, a Boeing 737, crashes on approach 2.6 km short of the runway in poor visibility in Ahmedabad, India, killing 133 of the 135 people on board.
 November 2 – LOT Polish Airlines Flight 703, an Antonov An-24, crashes on approach to Rzeszów-Jasionka Airport, killing one passenger, all others survive.
 December 21 – Pan Am Flight 103, a Boeing 747, disintegrates in the air over Lockerbie, Dumfries and Galloway, Scotland, after a terrorist bomb explodes on board. All 259 people on board and 11 on the ground are killed. The incident is also known as the Lockerbie air disaster.

1989 
 January 8 – British Midland Airways Flight 092, a Boeing 737, crashes near Kegworth, Leicestershire, United Kingdom, after one of its engines loses a fan blade and fails. Of the 118 passengers and eight crew, 79 survive. The incident became known as the Kegworth air disaster and is the first loss of a Boeing 737-400.
 February 8 – Independent Air Flight 1851, a Boeing 707, crashes into a hill on approach to Santa Maria, the Azores. All 144 people on board are killed.
 February 19 – Flying Tiger Line Flight 66, a Boeing 747 crashes near Kuala Lumpur, Malaysia, on approach to land, killing all four on board. The crash is caused by miscommunication between ATC and the crew.

 February 24 – United Airlines Flight 811, a Boeing 747, suffers an explosive decompression shortly after takeoff from Honolulu, Hawaii, United States, caused by a cargo door that burst open during flight. Of 355 people on board, nine passengers are blown out of the plane, but the crew manage to land safely at Honolulu.
 March 10 – Air Ontario Flight 1363, a Fokker F28, crashes immediately after takeoff from Dryden, Ontario, Canada, because of ice on the wings, killing 24 of 69 people on board.
 March 18 – Evergreen International Airlines Flight 17, a Douglas DC-9, crashes while attempting an emergency landing at Carswell Air Force Base in Fort Worth, Texas, after the main cargo door burst open immediately after takeoff, killing both pilots.
 March 21 – Transbrasil Flight 801, a Boeing 707, crashes on a high speed approach into São Paulo Guarulhos International Airport, the left wing striking a building and crashing into a residential area. All three crewmembers and 22 persons on the ground were killed. The 707 involved was used in the 1970 movie Airport when it was owned by Flying Tigers.
 June 7 – Surinam Airways Flight 764, a Douglas DC-8, crashes while attempting to land in heavy fog at Paramaribo, Suriname. The plane hits trees and flips upside down, killing 176 of 187 people on board.
 June 17 – Interflug Flight 102, an Ilyushin Il-62, overruns the runway whilst taking off from Berlin Schönefeld Airport, East Germany, killing 21 of 113 people on board.
 July 19 – United Airlines Flight 232, a McDonnell Douglas DC-10, suffers a complete hydraulic system failure over Iowa, United States, after the tail-mounted engine disintegrates. The crew maintains partial control of the aircraft using differential throttle, bringing it to a crash landing on the runway of the Sioux City, Iowa, airport. Of the 296 people on board, 112 die.
 July 27 – Korean Air Flight 803, a McDonnell Douglas DC-10, crashes while attempting to land in heavy fog at Tripoli, Libya. 75 of the 199 passengers and crew on board plus four people on the ground are killed in the accident.
 August 3 – Olympic Aviation Flight 545, a Shorts 330–220, crashes into Mount Kerkis in Greece. All 34 passengers and crew on board are killed.
 August 25 – Pakistan International Airlines Flight 404, a Fokker F27, disappears on a flight with 54 on board; the wreckage has never been found.
 September 3 – Cubana de Aviación Flight 9046, an Ilyushin Il-62M, crashes while trying to take off from José Martí International Airport in Havana, Cuba. All 126 people on board the aircraft plus 24 people on the ground are killed in the crash.
 September 3 – Varig Flight 254, a Boeing 737, runs out of fuel because of incorrect navigation and crashes in the Brazilian jungle, killing 13 of the 54 people on board.
 September 8 – Partnair Flight 394, a Convair 580, crashes into the North Sea after its tail section falls off in mid-air. All 55 people on board die. The disaster is blamed on counterfeit aircraft parts.
 September 19 – UTA Flight 772, a McDonnell Douglas DC-10, explodes in mid-air over the Sahara desert when a bomb hidden in its forward cargo hold detonates. All 170 people on board are killed. Responsibility for the bombing is later traced back to Abdullah Senussi, the brother-in-law of Libyan leader Muammar al-Gaddafi, whose government in 2003 agrees to pay compensation to the victims.
 September 20 – USAir Flight 5050, a Boeing 737, overruns the runway at LaGuardia Airport attempting to abort takeoff after a tire on a nosewheel bursts due to a mistrimmed rudder; two passengers die.
 October 21 – Tan-Sahsa Flight 414, a Boeing 727, crashes into a mountain known as Cerro de Hula near Tegucigalpa, Honduras, due to pilot error; 127 of 146 on board die.
 October 26 – China Airlines Flight 204, a Boeing 737, crashes into the Chiashan mountain range after takeoff from Hualien Airport due to pilot error; all 54 on board die.
 November 27 – Avianca Flight 203, a Boeing 727, explodes in mid-air over Colombia, killing all 107 people on board and three people on the ground. The Medellín Cartel claimed responsibility for the attack.
 December 15 – KLM Flight 867, a Boeing 747 flying from Amsterdam to Anchorage, Alaska, flies through a cloud of volcanic debris, subsequently losing power from all four engines. The crew is able to restart the engines and land the plane safely.
 December 26 – United Express Flight 2415, a BAe Jetstream 31 operated by North Pacific Airlines crashes while attempting to land at Tri-Cities Airport, Washington. All six passengers and crew are killed.

1990s

1990 
 January 4 – Northwest Airlines Flight 5, a Boeing 727 with 145 on board, loses an engine over Madison, Florida and the aircraft makes an emergency landing at Tampa International Airport. All on board survive.
 January 16 – SANSA Flight 32, crashes into a mountain just after takeoff from Juan Santamaria International Airport in San José, Costa Rica, killing all 20 passengers and three crew on board.

 January 25 – Avianca Flight 52, a Boeing 707, runs out of fuel and crashes while attempting to land at John F. Kennedy International Airport in New York; of the 158 people on board, 85 survive.
 February 14 – Indian Airlines Flight 605, an Airbus A320, crashes on its final approach to Bangalore Airport. 92 out of 146 people on board are killed.
 April 9 – Atlantic Southeast Airlines Flight 2254, an Embraer EMB 120 Brasilia, collides with a Cessna 172, both on the Cessna die. Flight 2254 lands; all seven on board survive.
 April 12 – Widerøe Flight 839, a DHC-6 Twin Otter, crashes into water just after takeoff from Værøy Airport, killing all five people on board.
 May 11 – Philippine Airlines Flight 143, a Boeing 737, explodes and burns on the ground at Ninoy Aquino International Airport, killing eight of 120 on board.
 June 10 – British Airways Flight 5390, a BAC One-Eleven, suffers explosive decompression over Didcot, Oxfordshire, England, when one of the front windscreen panes blows out. The captain is partially blown out of the cockpit, but a flight attendant manages to keep the unconscious pilot from falling out of the aircraft. The first officer lands the aircraft safely at Southampton Airport. All on board survive.
 October 2 – In the Guangzhou Baiyun airport collisions, a hijacked Boeing 737 operating Xiamen Airlines Flight 8301 clips China Southwest Airlines Flight 2402, a Boeing 707, during landing at Guangzhou Baiyun International Airport, and collides with China Southern Airlines Flight 2812, a Boeing 757; of the 225 occupants on board the three aircraft, 128 die.
 November 14 – Alitalia Flight 404, a McDonnell Douglas DC-9, crashes on approach to Zürich Airport, Switzerland, killing all 46 people on board.
 November 21 – Bangkok Airways Flight 125, a De Havilland Canada DHC-8-103, crashes on approach to Koh Samui Airport in Thailand, killing all 33 passengers and five crew on board.
 December 3 – In the 1990 Wayne County Airport runway collision, Northwest Airlines Flight 1482, a McDonnell Douglas DC-9, collides with Northwest Airlines Flight 299, a Boeing 727, on a runway at Detroit Metropolitan Wayne County Airport; eight of the 54 people on board the DC-9 are killed; all 154 people on board the Boeing 727 survive.

1991 

 February 1 – In the Los Angeles runway disaster, USAir Flight 1493, a Boeing 737 landing at Los Angeles International Airport, strikes SkyWest Airlines Flight 5569, a Fairchild Metro commuter plane waiting to take off from the same runway. All 12 people aboard the Metro and 23 of the 89 on the Boeing 737 are killed.
 February 17 – Ryan International Airlines Flight 590, a Douglas DC-9, crashes on takeoff from Cleveland Hopkins International Airport, Ohio, killing both pilots.
 February 20 – LAN Chile Flight 1069, a BAe 146, overruns the runway while landing at Puerto Williams, Chile, killing 20 of the 72 people on board.
 March 3 – United Airlines Flight 585, a Boeing 737, crashes while attempting to land at Colorado Springs Airport, Colorado, killing all 25 people on board. The cause of the crash is not identified until the investigation into the crash of USAir Flight 427 in 1994; both crashes are eventually attributed to defects in a valve associated with the rudder.
 March 5 – Aeropostal Alas de Venezuela Flight 108, a McDonnell Douglas DC-9 crashes into a mountain shortly after taking off from La Chinita International Airport, Venezuela. All 45 passengers and crew are killed.
 March 26 – Singapore Airlines Flight 117, an Airbus A310, is hijacked by Pakistani militants en route to Singapore Changi Airport, where, upon landing, it is stormed by Singapore Special Operations forces. All of the hijackers are killed in the operation, with no fatalities among the passengers and crew.
 April 5 – Atlantic Southeast Airlines Flight 2311, an Embraer EMB 120RT, rolls sharply and crashes on final approach to Brunswick, Georgia, killing all 23 people on board.
 May 26 – Lauda Air Flight 004, a Boeing 767, disintegrates in mid-air over Uthai Thani Province and Suphan Buri Province, Thailand, killing all 223 people on board. A thrust reverser had accidentally deployed in flight, causing the disaster. It is the first fatal crash of a Boeing 767.
 July 10 – L'Express Airlines Flight 508, a Beechcraft Model 99, crashes while on approach Birmingham Municipal Airport, Alabama, due to severe thunderstorms, killing 13 people on board.
 July 11 – Nigeria Airways Flight 2120, a Nationair McDonnell Douglas DC-8 chartered by Nigeria Airways to transport Nigerian pilgrims to Mecca, crashes shortly after takeoff from King Abdulaziz International Airport, Jeddah, Saudi Arabia, because of a fire caused by tire failure. All 261 on board die, including 14 Canadian crew members.
 August 16 – Indian Airlines Flight 257, a Boeing 737, hits high ground during descent about 30 km from Imphal Airport. All six crew members and 63 passengers are killed.
 September 11 – Continental Express Flight 2574, an Embraer EMB 120RT, crashes on descent in Eagle Lake, Texas, killing all 14 people on board. Maintenance crews traded work shifts during repairs to the horizontal stabilizer, inadvertently leaving 47 bolts missing. Reformers pointed to this error and called for development of a "safety culture".
 December 27 – Both engines of Scandinavian Airlines System Flight 751, a McDonnell Douglas MD-81, surge shortly after takeoff from Stockholm Arlanda Airport. The pilots successfully make an emergency landing in a nearby field, injuring 25 passengers but incurring not a single fatality.
 December 29 – China Airlines Flight 358, a Boeing 747 freighter, suffers double engine separation and crashes into a hill near Wanli, Taipei, Taiwan, killing all five crew on board.

1992 

 January 3 – CommutAir Flight 4281, a Beechcraft 1900C crashes on approach into Adirondack Regional Airport, New York. Two of the four occupants are killed.
 January 20 – Air Inter Flight 148, an Airbus A320, crashes in the Vosges Mountains on approach to Strasbourg, France, killing 87 of 96 people on board.
 February 15 – Air Transport International Flight 805, a Douglas DC-8 operated by Burlington Air Express, crashes during a second go-around attempt at Toledo Express Airport, Ohio, killing all four people on board and injuring 13 people on the ground.
 March 22 – USAir Flight 405, a Fokker F-28, crashes on takeoff from New York because of ice buildup. Twenty-seven of the 51 people on board are killed.
 March 31 – Trans-Air Service Flight 671, a Boeing 707-321C, experiences an in-flight separation of two engines on the right wing. Despite substantial control difficulties and a fire that breaks out on the right wing during approach, the pilots safely land at a military airbase in Istres, France. None of the five occupants are injured.
 June 6 – Copa Airlines Flight 201, a Boeing 737-200 Advanced, crashes near Darién, Panama, killing all 47 passengers and crew on board; a faulty attitude indicator is the cause.
 June 7 – American Eagle Flight 5456, a CASA C-212 Aviocar operated by Executive Airlines crashes on approach into Eugenio María de Hostos Airport, Puerto Rico. All five passengers and crew are killed.
 June 8 – GP Express Flight 861, a Beechcraft Model 99 crashes on approach into Anniston Metropolitan Airport, Alabama. Three of the six passengers and crew on board are killed.
 July 24 – Mandala Airlines Flight 660, a Vickers Viscount 816, crashes on approach to Pattimura Airport, Ambon, Indonesia, killing all 63 passengers and seven crew on board.
 July 30 – TWA Flight 843 aborts takeoff at John F. Kennedy International Airport. The Lockheed L-1011 turns off the runway onto grass in order to avoid striking a concrete barrier. The plane is destroyed by fire shortly after all 292 passengers and crew evacuate with no loss of life.
 July 31 – Thai Airways International Flight 311, an Airbus A310, crashes on approach into Kathmandu, Nepal, killing all 14 crew and 99 passengers on board.
 July 31 – China General Aviation Flight 7552, a Yakovlev 42D, loses control just after takeoff from Nanjing Airport and crashes into a pond; 108 of 126 on board die.
 August 27 – Aeroflot Flight 2808, a Tupolev Tu-134, crashes into buildings while attempting to land at Ivanovo Yuzhny Airport, killing all 84 on board.
 September 4 – Vietnam Airlines Flight 850, an Airbus A310-200, is hijacked by a former pilot in the Republic of Vietnam Air Force. He then drops anti-communist leaflets over Ho Chi Minh City before parachuting out. Vietnamese security forces later arrest him on the ground. The aircraft lands safely, and no one on board is injured.
 September 28 – Pakistan International Airlines Flight 268, an Airbus A300, crashes near Kathmandu, Nepal, killing all 12 crew and 155 passengers.
 October 4 – El Al Flight 1862, a Boeing 747, freighter, crashes into high-rise apartment buildings in Amsterdam after two of its engines detach from the wing. Forty-three people, including the plane's crew of three plus an additional passenger, are killed.
 October 18 – Merpati Nusantara Airlines Flight 5601, a CASA/IPTN CN-235, crashes into Mount Papandayan near the town Garut in Indonesia. All 31 passengers and crew on board are killed.
 November 14 – Vietnam Airlines Flight 474, a Yakovlev Yak-40, crashes while on approach to Nha Trang Airport in a tropical storm. Thirty people on board are killed.
 November 24 – China Southern Airlines Flight 3943, a Boeing 737-300, crashes on descent to Guilin Airport, killing all 141 aboard.
 December 21 – Martinair Flight 495 crashes in Faro, Portugal, killing 54 people and injuring 106.
 December 22 – Libyan Arab Airlines Flight 1103, a Boeing 727, collides with a Libyan Air Force MiG-23 near Tripoli International Airport, killing all 157 people aboard the 727. The two crew in the MiG-23 survive and later dispute the official explanation for the crash, claiming that the 727 was purposely destroyed while they were flying nearby.

1993 
 January 6 – Lufthansa CityLine Flight 5634, a de Havilland Canada DHC-8, crashes short of the runway at Paris–Charles de Gaulle Airport, killing four of 23 on board.
 February 8 – In the 1993 Tehran mid-air collision, an Iran Air Tours Tupolev Tu-154 collides in mid-air with an Iranian Air Force Sukhoi Su-24, killing all 133 on board both aircraft.
 February 11 – Lufthansa Flight 592, an Airbus A310-300, is hijacked and the pilot is forced to fly to John F. Kennedy International Airport. The plane lands safely and the hijacker surrenders. All 104 on board survive.
 March 5 – Palair Macedonian Airlines Flight 301, a Fokker 100, crashes shortly after takeoff from Skopje Airport in Macedonia; 83 of the 97 passengers and crew on board are killed.
 April 6 – China Eastern Airlines Flight 583, a McDonnell Douglas MD-11, makes an emergency landing at Shemya Air Force Base after the slats are accidentally deployed in mid-air near the Aleutian Islands; all on board initially survive, but two die later.
 April 14 – American Airlines Flight 102, a McDonnell Douglas DC-10, veers off the runway on landing at Dallas/Fort Worth International Airport; all on board survive.
 April 18 – Japan Air System Flight 451, a McDonnell Douglas DC-9, encounters windshear and skids off the runway at Hanamaki Airport; all on board survive.
 April 24 – Indian Airlines Flight 427, a Boeing 737-200, is hijacked on a flight between New Delhi and Srinagar, India. The plane lands at Amritsar Airport where it is stormed by commandos; the hijacker is killed and the 140 passengers and crew survive without injury.
 April 26 – Indian Airlines Flight 491, a Boeing 737, strikes a large vehicle on a road just outside Aurangabad Airport, killing 55 of the 118 people on board.
 May 19 – SAM Colombia Flight 501, a Boeing 727, crashes into Mount Paramo Frontino, killing all 132 on board.
 July 1 – Merpati Nusantara Airlines Flight 724, a Fokker F28, collides with a small hill near the sea, breaks up and plunges into the sea shortly afterwards, killing 41 people on board.
 July 23 – China Northwest Airlines Flight 2119, a BAe 146, overruns the runway at Yinchuan Hedong Airport, Ningxia, China after an aborted takeoff; the aircraft crashes into a lake, killing 54 passengers and one crew member.
 July 26 – Asiana Airlines Flight 733, a Boeing 737, crashes into a mountain in Haenam, South Korea, after failed landing attempts, killing 78 of the 110 people on board; this crash is the first loss of a Boeing 737-500.
 August 18 – American International Airways Flight 808, a DC-8, stalls on approach to Guantanamo Bay and crashes. Everyone survives.
 August 26 – Sakha Avia Flight 301, a Let L-410 Turbolet, crashes on approach to Aldan Airport in Russia, killing all 24 people on board.
 August 28 – A Tajik Air Yakovlev Yak-40 crashes after overshooting the runway on takeoff from Khorog Airport, killing 82 of the 86 people on board; the accident is the deadliest involving the Yak-40 as well as the deadliest accident in Tajikistan to date.
 August 31 – An Everest Air Dornier Do 228 crashes near Bharatpur in Nepal, killing all 19 people on board.

 September 14 – Lufthansa Flight 2904, an Airbus A320, crashes after overrunning the runway in Warsaw, Poland, killing two and injuring 68 of the 72 people on board.
 September 21 – In the first of the three Transair Georgia airliner shootdowns, a Tupolev Tu-134A is hit on approach to Sukhumi-Babusheri Airport by a surface-to-air missile; the plane crashes into the Black Sea, killing all five crew members and all 22 passengers.
 September 22 – In the second of the three Transair Georgia airliner shootdowns, a Tupolev Tu-154, carrying soldiers from Tbilisi, is shot down on landing in the Sukhumi-Babusheri Airport; the plane crashes on the runway and catches fire, killing 108 of the 132 people on board.
 October 26 – China Eastern Airlines Flight 5398, a McDonnell Douglas MD-82, overruns the runway at Fuzhou Changle International Airport in heavy weather, killing two of 80 on board.
 October 27 – Widerøe Flight 744, a de Havilland Canada DHC-6 Twin Otter, crashes in Overhalla, Norway, on approach to Namsos Airport, killing both pilots and four passengers; the crash is also known as the Namsos Accident.
 November 4 – China Airlines Flight 605, a Boeing 747-400, overruns Kai Tak Airport's runway 13 on landing during a typhoon; the aircraft is unable to stop before crashing into Hong Kong harbor; all 374 on board escape safely; this crash is the first loss of a Boeing 747-400.
 November 13 – China Northern Airlines Flight 6901, a McDonnell Douglas MD-82, crashes on approach to Ürümqi Diwopu International Airport, Xinjiang, China; killing 12 of the 102 on board; pilot error is blamed.
 November 20 – Avioimpex Flight 110, a Yakovlev Yak-42, crashes on approach to Ohrid Airport in Macedonia; all 116 passengers and crew die as a result of the crash, though one passenger lived for 11 days before succumbing to his injuries.
 December 1 – Northwest Airlink Flight 5719, a Jetstream 31, crashes into two ridges east of Hibbing, Minnesota, killing all 18 on board.

1994 

 January 3 – Baikal Airlines Flight 130, a Tupolev Tu-154, loses control and crashes near Irkutsk, Russia, after the hydraulic system failed due to an engine fire, killing all 124 on board and one person on the ground.
 January 7 – United Express Flight 6291, a BAe Jetstream 41 crashes on approach into Port Columbus International Airport, Ohio. Five of the eight passengers and crew are killed.
 February 24 – Pulkovo Aviation Enterprise Flight 9045, an Antonov An-12BP crashes on approach into Nalchik Airport, Russia. All 13 passengers and crew are killed. The aircraft was carrying 12,515 kg of coins from the Saint Petersburg Mint.
 March 8 – A Sahara Airlines Boeing 737 crashes during a training flight into an Aeroflot Ilyushin Il-86 at New Delhi, India, killing all 8 on both aircraft and 1 on the ground.
 March 23 – Aeroflot Flight 593, an Airbus A310, crashes into a wooded hillside in Siberia. All 75 passengers and crew are killed.
 April 4 – KLM Cityhopper Flight 433, a Saab 340, crashes while trying to return to Schiphol Airport, due to pilot error and equipment failure; the pilot and two passengers die, nine passengers are injured.
 April 7 – Federal Express Flight 705, a McDonnell Douglas DC-10-30, experiences an attempted hijacking by a FedEx employee; the three crew members are severely injured, but manage to subdue the attacker and land the aircraft safely with no loss of life.
 April 26 – China Airlines Flight 140, an Airbus A300, crashes while landing at Nagoya, Japan, as a result of pilot error. 264 of the 271 people on board die.
 June 6 – China Northwest Airlines Flight 2303, a Tupolev Tu-154M, breaks up in mid-air and crashes near Xian, China, killing all 160 on board. The deadliest airplane crash ever to occur in China is attributed to a maintenance error.
 June 30 – Airbus Industrie Flight 129, an Airbus A330 on a test flight, crashes at France's Toulouse-Blagnac Airport, killing all seven on board.
 July 1 – Air Mauritanie Flight 625, a Fokker F28 Fellowship crashes on landing at Tidjikja Airport, Mauritania in sandstorm conditions. 80 of the 93 passengers and crew are killed.
 July 2 – USAir Flight 1016, a McDonnell Douglas DC-9, crashes while attempting to land at Charlotte, North Carolina, during a thunderstorm. 37 of the 57 people on board are killed.
 July 19 – Alas Chiricanas Flight 901, an Embraer EMB-110, explodes in mid-air over Panama, killing all 21 people on board. Investigators conclude that a suicide bomber caused the plane to explode, although motives and affiliation of the bomber remain unclear.
 August 21 – Royal Air Maroc Flight 630, an ATR-42, is deliberately crashed into the Atlas Mountains, killing all 44 on board.
 September 8 – USAir Flight 427, a Boeing 737, crashes while attempting to land at Pittsburgh International Airport, killing all 132 people on board. Investigations showed that a fault in the Boeing 737 rudder was to blame for the crash.
 September 26 – In the 1994 Vanavara air disaster, a Yakovlev Yak-40 operated by Cheremshanka Airlines crashes near Vanavara, Russia after running out of fuel in bad weather, killing 28 passengers and crew.
 October 12 – Iran Aseman Airlines Flight 746, a Fokker F-28, crashes into a mountain near Natanz, Iran, due to double engine failure, killing all 66 on board.
 October 31 – American Eagle Flight 4184, an ATR 72 turboprop, crashes near Roselawn, Indiana, while waiting to land at Chicago, because of ice buildup on its wings. All 68 people on board die.
 November 3 – Scandinavian Airlines System Flight 347, a McDonnell Douglas MD-82 operating a domestic flight in Norway, is hijacked by a Bosnian national; after landing at Bodø Airport to release some hostages, the aircraft flies on to Oslo Airport where the hijacker later surrenders.
 November 22 – TWA Flight 427, a McDonnell Douglas MD-82, collides with a Superior Aviation Cessna 441 on the runway at Lambert-St. Louis International Airport, killing the pilot and passenger in the Cessna; there are no fatalities on board the MD-82.
 December 11 – A bomb explodes on board Philippine Airlines Flight 434, a Boeing 747, killing one passenger, in a prelude to the terrorist Bojinka plot. Despite subsequent difficulties in controlling the aircraft, the crew succeeds in making an emergency landing at Naha, Okinawa.
 December 19 – Nigeria Airways Flight 9805, a Boeing 707 operating a cargo flight between Saudi Arabia and Nigeria, suffers an in-flight fire before crashing into marshland in Nigeria; both passengers and one of the three crew members are killed.
 December 21 – Air Algérie Flight 702P, a Boeing 737, crashes on approach to Coventry Airport, England, killing all five on board.
 December 24 – Air France Flight 8969, an Airbus A300, is hijacked on the tarmac at Algiers, Algeria, by the militant group GIA. After a two-day standoff, the plane is allowed to fly to Marseille, France, where it is stormed by French commandos, who kill the four hijackers.
 December 29 – Turkish Airlines Flight 278, a Boeing 737-400, crashes on final approach to Van Ferit Melen Airport in eastern Turkey in driving snow. Five of the seven crew and 52 of the 69 passengers are killed.

1995 

 January 11 – Intercontinental de Aviación Flight 256, a Douglas DC-9, crashes in a lagoon near María La Baja, Colombia due to an improperly set altimeter, killing 51 of 52 on board.
 January 19 – Bristow Helicopters Flight 56C, a Eurocopter Super Puma, is struck by lightning and is forced to make an emergency landing in the North Sea; all 18 on board survive.
 January 30 – TransAsia Airways Flight 510A, an ATR 72–200 on a re-positioning flight from Penghu to Taipei, crashes into a hill in Guishan District, Taoyuan, killing all four crew members.
 February 16 – Air Transport International Flight 782, a Douglas DC-8 on a re-positioning flight, crashes after failing to get airborne at Kansas City International Airport, Missouri, killing all three crew members.
 March 31 – TAROM Flight 371, an Airbus A310, crashes near Balotești, Romania due to mechanical failure and pilot error, killing all 60 on board.
 May 24 – Knight Air Flight 816, an Embraer EMB 110 Bandeirante crashes whilst trying to return to Leeds Bradford Airport, UK in poor weather. All 12 passengers and crew are killed.
 June 9 – Ansett New Zealand Flight 703, a de Havilland Canada DHC-8, crashes during a landing approach near the Tararua Ranges, New Zealand, killing four of the 21 people on board.
 June 21 – All Nippon Airways Flight 857, a Boeing 747SR, is hijacked on a domestic flight between Tokyo and Hakodate in Japan; after landing at its destination, the aircraft is later stormed by police and the hijacker is arrested; all 365 people on board survive the incident.
 August 3 – In the Airstan incident, an Airstan Ilyushin Il-76TD operated as Flight 199 is intercepted by a Taliban-controlled fighter aircraft before being forced to divert to Kandahar International Airport in Afghanistan; the seven crew are held captive for over a year before overpowering their captors and fleeing in the aircraft.
 August 9 – Aviateca Flight 901, a Boeing 737, crashes into San Vicente volcano while on approach to Cuscatlán International Airport; all 65 on board die.
 August 21 – Atlantic Southeast Airlines Flight 529, an Embraer EMB 120, crashes in a field near Carrollton, Georgia, United States, killing nine of the 29 people on board.
 September 15 – Malaysia Airlines Flight 2133, a Fokker 50, crashes into a shantytown in Malaysia due to pilot error, killing 34 of 53 on board.
 September 21 – MIAT Flight 557, an Antonov An-24, crashes into a mountain near Mörön Airport, Mongolia due to pilot error; of the 43 on board, only a passenger survives. The accident remains the deadliest in Mongolia.
 November 12 – American Airlines Flight 1572, a McDonnell Douglas MD-83, collides with trees on approach causing a loss of both engines. It loses altitude, and strikes runway antennas before rolling to a stop. There is one minor injury of the 78 people on board.
 November 13 – Nigeria Airways Flight 357, a Boeing 737, overruns the runway while landing at Kaduna Airport, killing 11 of 138 on board.
 December 3 – Cameroon Airlines Flight 3701, a Boeing 737, loses control and crashes while on approach to Douala International Airport, Cameroon; of the 76 on board, five survive.
 December 5 – Azerbaijan Airlines Flight 56, a Tupolev Tu-134, crashes on climbout from Nakhchivan Airport after an engine fails due to improper maintenance, killing 52 of 82 on board.
 December 7 – Khabarovsk United Air Group Flight 3949, a Tupolev Tu-154B crashes after entering a steep downward spiral while at cruising altitude. All 98 passengers and crew are killed.
 December 7 – In the 1995 Air St. Martin Beech 1900 crash, a Beechcraft 1900D crashes near Belle-Anse, Haiti, killing all 20 people on board.
 December 13 – Banat Air Flight 166, a Romavia Antonov An-24, crashes after taking off from Verona Airport, because of overloading and ice accumulation on the wings; all 49 people on board are killed.
 December 18 – In the 1995 Trans Service Airlift Electra crash, a Lockheed L-188 Electra crashes shortly after takeoff from Jamba, Angola, due to overloading and shifting baggage; of the 144 people on board, only three survive.
 December 20 – American Airlines Flight 965, a Boeing 757, crashes into a mountain while approaching Alfonso Bonilla Aragón International Airport in Palmira, Colombia, killing 159 of 163 on board.
 December 20 – Tower Air Flight 41, a Boeing 747, veers off the runway during takeoff from John F. Kennedy International Airport, New York. All 468 people on board survive, but 25 people are injured; the aircraft is written off.

1996 

 January 8 – In the 1996 Air Africa crash, an overloaded Antonov An-32 operated by Moscow Airways aborts takeoff and overruns into a market in Kinshasa, Democratic Republic of the Congo, killing 227 people on the ground.
 February 6 – Birgenair Flight 301, a Boeing 757, with 189 people on board, crashes into the ocean off Puerto Plata in the Dominican Republic shortly after taking off. All passengers and crew are killed.
 February 29 – Faucett Flight 251, a Boeing 737, crashes into a hill while attempting to land at Arequipa, Peru. All 123 people on board die.
 May 11 – ValuJet Flight 592, a McDonnell Douglas DC-9, crashes in the Everglades near Miami, Florida, because of a fire in its cargo hold. All 110 people on board are killed.
 June 9 – Eastwind Airlines Flight 517, a Boeing 737-200, loses rudder control while on approach to Richmond International Airport, Richmond, Virginia, and makes an emergency landing; no fatalities.
 June 13 – Garuda Indonesia Flight 865, a McDonnell Douglas DC-10, aborts takeoff due to an engine failure and crashes into a threshold at Fukuoka Airport, Fukuoka, Japan, killing three of 275 on board.
 July 6 – Delta Air Lines Flight 1288, a McDonnell Douglas MD-88, experiences an uncontained engine failure during takeoff on Runway 17 at Pensacola, Florida. Fragments from the number one (left) Pratt & Whitney JT8D-219 turbofan engine penetrate the fuselage, killing two and seriously injuring two of the 142 people on board.
 July 17 – TWA Flight 800, a Boeing 747, explodes in mid-air above the ocean off East Moriches, New York, killing all 230 people on board; 70% of passengers are sucked out during the explosion.
 August 19 – Spair Airlines Flight 3601, an Ilyushin Il-76, crashes near Belgrade, Yugoslavia, with 11 fatalities.
 August 29 – Vnukovo Airlines Flight 2801, a Tupolev Tu-154, crashes into a mountain on Spitsbergen, an island in the Norwegian archipelago of Svalbard, killing all 141 on board. It remains Norway's worst air disaster to date.
 September 3 – Hemus Air Flight 7081, a Tupolev Tu-154 is hijacked while en route from Beirut, Lebanon to Varna, Bulgaria. After landing in Varna, the 150 passengers are traded for fuel. The plane then flies on to Oslo Gardermoen Airport, Norway, where the hijacker later surrenders.
 October 2 – Aeroperú Flight 603, a Boeing 757, crashes into the ocean off Pasamayo, Peru, because of a maintenance error. All 70 people on board are killed.
 October 31 – TAM Transportes Aéreos Regionais Flight 402, a Fokker 100, crashes shortly after takeoff from Congonhas-São Paulo Airport, Brazil, striking an apartment building and several houses. All 89 passengers and six crew members on board die. Four people are killed on the ground.
 November 7 – ADC Airlines Flight 086, a Boeing 727, crashes when the crew loses control of the aircraft while avoiding a mid-air collision on approach to Lagos, Nigeria. All 144 passengers and crew on board are killed.
 November 12 – 1996 Charkhi Dadri mid-air collision: Saudi Arabian Airlines Flight 763, a Boeing 747, collides in mid-air with Kazakhstan Airlines Flight 1907, an Ilyushin Il-76, near Charkhi Dadri, India. All 312 on board the Boeing 747 and all 37 on board the Ilyushin Il-76 are killed. It is the deadliest mid-air collision in aviation history.
 November 19 – United Express Flight 5925, a Beechcraft 1900, collides with a privately owned Beechcraft King Air at Quincy Regional Airport, Illinois; killing all 14 on board both aircraft.
 November 23 – Ethiopian Airlines Flight 961, a Boeing 767, is hijacked over Kenya. The aircraft runs out of fuel, and the pilot attempts to ditch the aircraft in the ocean off Moroni, Comoros. Of the 175 people on board, 125 are killed (including the three hijackers).
 December 7 – Dirgantara Air Service Flight 5940, a CASA C-212 Aviocar crashes into a gas factory shortly after takeoff from Syamsudin Noor International Airport, Indonesia following an engine failure. 16 of the 17 passengers and crew are killed, as well as two on the ground.
 December 22 – Airborne Express Flight 827, a Douglas DC-8, stalls and crashes during a test flight in Narrows, Virginia, killing all 6 people on board.

1997 
 January 9 – Comair Flight 3272, an Embraer EMB 120 Brasília, crashes near Ida, Michigan, during a snowstorm, killing all 29 on board.
 March 18 – Stavropolskaya Aktsionernaya Avia Flight 1023, an Antonov An-24, breaks up in flight and crashes near Cherkessk, Russia; all 50 on board die.
 April 19 – Merpati Nusantara Airlines Flight 106, a BAe ATP crashes during a failed go-around in bad weather at Buluh Tumbang International Airport, Indonesia. 15 of the 53 passengers and crew are killed.
 May 8 – China Southern Airlines Flight 3456, a Boeing 737, makes a hard landing in Shenzhen, China, during poor weather and crashes, killing 35 of the 74 people on board.
 July 17 – Sempati Air Flight 304, a Fokker F27, crashes shortly after takeoff from Husein Sastranegara International Airport, killing 28 people on board.
 July 30 – Air Littoral Flight 701, an ATR 42 flying from France to Italy, overshoots the runway at Florence Airport and crashes into a ditch; all 14 passengers and two of the three crew members survive, but the pilot is killed in the accident.
 July 31 – FedEx Express Flight 14, a McDonnell Douglas MD-11, crashes upon landing at Newark Liberty International Airport; the two crew members and three passengers escape uninjured.
 August 6 – Korean Air Flight 801, a Boeing 747, crashes while attempting to land in heavy rain at Guam International Airport; of the 254 people on board, 229 die.
 August 7 – Fine Air Flight 101, a McDonnell Douglas DC-8-61F, crashes after take-off at Miami International Airport; all four people on board and one person on the ground are killed.
 August 10 – Formosa Airlines Flight 7601, a Dornier Do 228, crashes while attempting to land at Beigan, Lienchiang, in the Matsu Islands. All 16 passengers and crew on board are killed.
 September 3 – Vietnam Airlines Flight 815, a Tupolev Tu-134, crashes on approach to Phnom Penh International Airport in heavy rain, killing 65 of the 66 people on board.
 September 6 – Royal Brunei Airlines Flight 238, a Dornier Do 228, crashes into a hillside in Lambir Hills National Park, killing all 10 on board.
 September 26 – Garuda Indonesia Flight 152, an Airbus A300, crashes into a mountain near Buah Nabar, Indonesia, killing all 234 on board.
 October 10 – Austral Líneas Aéreas Flight 2553, a McDonnell Douglas DC-9, crashes near Fray Bentos, Uruguay, traveling from Posadas to Buenos Aires, resulting in the death of all 74 occupants.
 December 15 – Tajikistan Airlines Flight 3183, a Tupolev Tu-154, crashes into the desert near Sharjah Airport, of the 86 on board, only the flight engineer survives.
 December 16 – Air Canada Flight 646, a Bombardier CRJ100ER operating a domestic flight in Canada, crashes on landing at Fredericton, New Brunswick, after a failed go-around attempt; all 42 passengers and crew survive the accident.
 December 17 – Aerosvit Flight 241, a Yakovlev Yak-42, crashes near Thessaloniki, Greece, killing all 70 people on board.
 December 19 – SilkAir Flight 185, a Boeing 737, crashes into the Musi River near Palembang, Indonesia, killing all 104 people on board.
 December 28 – United Airlines Flight 826, a Boeing 747, encounters severe turbulence two hours into the flight; the aircraft safely lands back in Tokyo; all survive the accident, but a passenger dies later; despite having no damage, the aircraft is written off.

1998 

 February 2 – Cebu Pacific Flight 387, a McDonnell Douglas DC-9, crashes into a mountain near Mount Sumagaya in Misamis Oriental in the Philippines, killing all 104 passengers and crew members on board.
 February 16 – China Airlines Flight 676, an Airbus A300, crashes into a residential area while attempting to land in Taipei, Taiwan. All 196 people on board are killed, in addition to seven on the ground.
 March 18 – Formosa Airlines Flight 7623, a Saab 340, crashes in the ocean shortly after take-off following an electrical failure, killing all 13 on board.
 March 19 – In the 1998 Ariana Afghan Airlines crash, a Boeing 727 crashes into Sharki Baratayi Mountain while on approach to Kabul International Airport, killing all 45 on board.
 March 22 – Philippine Airlines Flight 137, an Airbus A320, overshoots the end of the runway while landing at Bacolod City in the Philippines, plowing through several houses. None of the passengers was harmed, but three people on the ground are killed and several more injured.
 April 20 – Air France Flight 422, a Boeing 727 leased from TAME Airlines, crashes into the mountains east of Bogotá, Colombia, on takeoff from El Dorado International Airport of Bogotá in foggy weather. All 53 passengers and crew die.
 May 5 – In the 1998 Occidental Petroleum Boeing 737 crash, a Boeing 737 leased from the Peruvian Air Force crashes while on approach to Alférez FAP Alfredo Vladimir Sara Bauer Airport, killing 75 of 88 on board.
 May 25 – Pakistan International Airlines Flight 544, a Fokker F-27, is hijacked shortly after takeoff by three armed men. F-16 fighter jets intercept the plane and force it to land. The hijackers are arrested and sentenced to death. All 38 on board survive.
 May 26 – The 1998 MIAT Mongolian Airlines crash: a Harbin Y-12 crashes 13 minutes after takeoff from Erdenet Airport, Mongolia, killing all 28 passengers and crew.
 June 18 – Propair Flight 420, a Fairchild Metroliner crashes shortly after takeoff from Dorval Airport (now Montréal–Pierre Elliott Trudeau International Airport), Canada following an inflight fire. All 11 passengers and crew are killed.
 July 30 – Proteus Airlines Flight 706: a Beechcraft 1900D collides in mid-air with a light aircraft over Quiberon Bay. Both aircraft crash into the sea, killing 15 people.
 August 5 – Korean Air Flight 8702, a Boeing 747-400 flying from Japan to South Korea, rolls off the runway at Gimpo Airport in Seoul and crashes into a ditch; all 395 passengers and crew survive the accident.
 August 24 – Myanma Airways Flight 635, a Fokker F-27 Friendship, crashes while on approach to Tachilek Airport; all 36 on board die.
 August 29 – Cubana de Aviación Flight 389, a Tupolev Tu-154M, overruns the runway whilst taking off from Quito's Mariscal Sucre International Airport, Ecuador, proceeding to crash into a soccer field. 70 of the 91 passengers and crew are killed, along with 10 on the ground.
 September 2 – Swissair Flight 111, a McDonnell Douglas MD-11, crashes into the sea near Halifax, Nova Scotia in Canada, because of an onboard fire. All 229 people on board die.
 September 25 – PauknAir Flight 4101, a BAe 146, leaves Málaga but never reaches its destination in Melilla. All 38 passengers and four crew on board die.
 September 29 – Lionair Flight 602, an Antonov An-24, is shot down by the Liberation Tigers of Tamil Eelam and crashes off the coast of Jaffna, Sri Lanka, killing all 55 on board.
 October 10 – The 1998 Lignes Aériennes Congolaises crash occurs when rebels using a Strela 2 missile shoot down the Boeing 727, which crashes near Kindu, Democratic Republic of Congo, killing all 41 on board.
 December 11 – Thai Airways International Flight 261, an Airbus A310, crashes during poor weather near Surat Thani, Thailand. Of the 146 people on board, 101 are killed.

1999 

 February 24 – China Southwest Airlines Flight 4509, a Tupolev Tu-154, crashes while on approach to Wenzhou Airport, killing all 61 passengers and crew on board.
 February 25 – Alitalia Flight 1553, a Dornier 328, loses control and overruns the runway while landing at Genoa Airport in Italy; 3 passengers and one crew member are killed.
 March 15 – Korean Air Flight 1533, a McDonnell Douglas MD-83 operating a domestic flight in South Korea, overshoots the runway on landing in Pohang; all 156 people on board survive the incident but the aircraft is destroyed.
 April 7 – Turkish Airlines Flight 5904, a Boeing 737-400, crashes in poor weather near Hamdilli, Ceyhan, Turkey; all six crew die.
 April 15 – Korean Air Cargo Flight 6316, a McDonnell Douglas MD-11F, crashes shortly after takeoff from Shanghai Hongqiao Airport, China. All three crew members, as well as five on the ground, are killed.
 June 1 – American Airlines Flight 1420, a McDonnell Douglas MD-82 with 139 passengers on board, skids off the runway on landing and crashes into a steel walkway at Little Rock, Arkansas during strong winds; 11 are killed, and 86 are injured.
 July 23 – All Nippon Airways Flight 61, a Boeing 747, is hijacked by a passenger, Yuji Nishizawa, wielding a knife; after fatally stabbing the captain, he is overpowered by the crew; the first officer lands the plane safely at Haneda, Japan.
 July 24 – Air Fiji Flight 121, an Embraer EMB 110 Bandeirante, crashes into a mountain en route to Nadi International Airport, Fiji. All 17 passengers and crew are killed.
 August 7 – TACV Flight 5002, a Dornier Do 228, crashes into a mountain whilst returning to São Pedro Airport, Cape Verde in poor weather. All 18 passengers and crew are killed.
 August 22 – China Airlines Flight 642, a McDonnell Douglas MD-11, crashes on landing at Hong Kong International Airport during Typhoon Sam; of the 315 people on board, three die.
 August 24 – Uni Air Flight 873, a McDonnell Douglas MD-90, suffers an explosion and catches fire after landing in Hualien, Taiwan due to hazardous materials stored in the overhead bins, killing one passenger.
 August 31 – LAPA Flight 3142, a Boeing 737, overshoots the runway in Buenos Aires, Argentina, and crashes into a golf course; of the 103 people on board, 63 are killed, as well as two on the ground.
 September 5 – Necon Air Flight 128, a BAe 748, collides with a telecommunications tower whilst on approach into Kathmandu Airport, Nepal. All 15 passengers and crew are killed.
 September 14 – Britannia Airways Flight 226A, a Boeing 757, veers off the runway at Girona, Spain, while landing in a thunderstorm and comes to rest in a field, broken apart in two places; 43 on board are injured, two seriously, but a passenger initially diagnosed as "lightly injured" dies five days later of unnoticed internal injuries.
 September 23 – Qantas Flight 1, a Boeing 747, runs off the runway due to a storm and comes to a complete stop just short of a golf course. All on board, including 30 injured passengers, survive.
 October 31 – EgyptAir Flight 990, a Boeing 767 bound for Cairo, Egypt, crashes into the Atlantic Ocean off Nantucket, Massachusetts, killing all 217 passengers and crew; cause is disputed: a deliberate suicide/homicide act by the relief first officer according to the NTSB, vs. a Boeing mechanical flaw according to Egyptian aviation authorities.
 November 9 – TAESA Flight 725, a McDonnell Douglas DC-9, crashes near Uruapan, Mexico, killing all 18 on board.
 November 12 – Si Fly Flight 3275, an ATR 42-300 operating a UN relief flight strikes a mountain in poor weather whilst on approach into Pristina Airport, Kosovo. All 24 passengers and crew are killed.
 December 7 – Asian Spirit Flight 100, a Let L-410 Turbolet, crashes into a mountain while on approach to Cauayan Airport, killing all 15 passengers and crew on board.
 December 11 – SATA Air Açores Flight 530M, a BAe ATP crashes into a mountain whilst on approach into Flores Airport in the Azores. All 35 passengers and crew are killed.
 December 21 – Cubana de Aviación Flight 1216, a McDonnell Douglas DC-10, overruns the runway at La Aurora International Airport, killing 16 of 314 people on board and another two on the ground.
 December 22 – Korean Air Cargo Flight 8509, a Boeing 747-200F, crashes after takeoff near Great Hallingbury, England; killing all four crew.
 December 24 – Indian Airlines Flight 814, an Airbus A300, is hijacked en route to Delhi, India; one hostage is killed.
 December 25 – Cubana de Aviación Flight 310, a Yakovlev Yak-42D, crashes into the San Luis Hill near Bejuma, Venezuela, while on approach to Arturo Michelena International Airport; all 22 on board die.

2000s

2000 
 January 10 – Crossair Flight 498, a Saab 340, crashes two minutes after takeoff in Niederhasli, Switzerland, killing all 10 people on board.
 January 13 – A Short 360 operated by Avisto ditches into the sea near Marsa Brega, Libya, as a result of ice buildup, killing 22 of the 41 passengers and crew on board.
 January 30 – Kenya Airways Flight 431, an Airbus A310, carrying 169 passengers and 10 crew members, crashes into the Atlantic Ocean off Côte d'Ivoire after takeoff from Abidjan; only 10 of the 179 people on board survive.
 January 31 – Alaska Airlines Flight 261, an MD-83, crashes into the Pacific Ocean off Point Mugu, California, after experiencing problems with its horizontal stabilizer; all 83 passengers and five crew members are killed.
 February 16 – Emery Worldwide Airlines Flight 17, a DC-8-71F crashes into a salvage yard shortly after takeoff from Sacramento Mather Airport, California, killing the three crew members on board.
 March 5 – Southwest Airlines Flight 1455, a Boeing 737-300, overshoots the runway in Burbank, California; 44 of the 142 people on board are injured, two seriously.
 April 19 – Air Philippines Flight 541, a Boeing 737-200, crashes in a coconut plantation on Samal Island, Davao del Norte while preparing to approach the Davao International Airport, killing all 131 people on board in one of the deadliest accidents involving the 737-200 and the deadliest in Philippines.
 May 25 – Philippine Airlines Flight 812, an Airbus A330-301 operating a domestic flight in the Philippines, undergoes an attempted hijacking shortly before landing at Ninoy Aquino International Airport in Manila; all 290 passengers and crew survive the incident, but the hijacker jumps from the aircraft to his death.
 June 22 – Wuhan Airlines Flight 343, a Xian Y-7, is struck by lightning and crashes in Hanyang District, Wuhan, killing all 42 on board and another seven on the ground in the worst ever accident involving the Y-7.
 July 4 – Malév Hungarian Airlines Flight 262, a Tupolev Tu-154, lands on its belly at Thessaloniki International Airport in Greece; there are no serious injuries or fatalities.
 July 8 – Aerocaribe Flight 7831, a British Aerospace Jetstream 32, crashes near Chulum Juárez, Mexico, killing all 19 on board.
 July 12 – Hapag-Lloyd Flight 3378, an Airbus A310, crash lands  short of the runway in Vienna after running out of fuel in flight; there are no serious injuries or fatalities.
 July 17 – Alliance Air Flight 7412, a Boeing 737-200, crashes into government housing in Patna, India, as it approaches the airport, killing 55 of the 58 on board and five people on the ground.
 July 25 – Air France Flight 4590, a Concorde crashes during takeoff from Paris, France, after striking debris on the runway, killing all 100 passengers and nine crew aboard as well as four people on the ground; the entire Concorde fleet is grounded for one year.
 July 27 – A Royal Nepal Airlines de Havilland Canada DHC-6 Twin Otter crashes into Jarayakhali Hill in western Nepal, while operating a domestic passenger flight from Bajhang Airport to Dhangadhi Airport, killing all 25 people on board.
 August 23 – Gulf Air Flight 072, an Airbus A320, crashes into the Persian Gulf off Manama, Bahrain, while attempting to land; all 135 passengers and eight crew members are killed.
 October 19 – Lao Aviation Flight 703, a Harbin Y-12 flying a domestic passenger flight in Laos, crashes into a mountain 12 km from Nathong Airport, killing eight of the 17 people on board.
 October 31 – Singapore Airlines Flight 006, a Boeing 747-400, strikes construction equipment after using a closed runway for takeoff at Chiang Kai-shek International Airport, Taiwan, killing 83 out of 179 people on board.
 November 15 – An ASA Pesada Antonov An-24RV crashes shortly after takeoff from Luanda's Quatro de Fevereiro International Airport, Angola, after suffering a catastrophic engine failure; all 57 passengers and crew are killed.
 November 18 – Dirgantara Air Service Flight 3130, a Britten Norman BN-2 Islander operating a domestic flight in Indonesia, crashes into a forest on takeoff from Datah Dawai Airport in East Kalimantan due to overloading and pilot error; all 18 occupants survive the incident but 11 are seriously injured.
 December 4 – Sabena Flight 877, an Airbus A330-223, is damaged by Hutu rebels firing machine guns during landing at Bujumbura International Airport, Burundi; all 170 on board escape without fatalities, two people are injured.

2001 

 January 23 – Yemenia Flight 448, a Boeing 727, is hijacked 15 minutes after takeoff from Sana'a International Airport, Yemen; the crew makes an emergency landing at Djibouti; the hijacker is subdued with no casualties to the 91 passengers or 10 crew members on board.
 January 25 – RUTACA Airlines Flight 225, a Douglas DC-3, crashes shortly after takeoff from Tomás de Heres Airport, Venezuela, as a result of an engine failure; all 24 passengers and crew are killed.
 January 31 – In the 2001 Japan Airlines mid-air incident, Japan Airlines Flight 907, a Douglas DC-10, and Japan Airlines Flight 958, a Boeing 747, narrowly avoid colliding by a margin of 36 feet (11 meters) near Yaizu, Japan.
 February 27 – Loganair Flight 670A, a Short 360 operating a postal flight, crashes shortly after takeoff from Edinburgh Airport, Scotland, as a result of a double engine failure; both crew members are killed.
 March 3 – Thai Airways International Flight 114, a Boeing 737-400, is destroyed by an explosion while on the tarmac at Don Mueang Airport, Thailand, prior to boarding; one flight attendant is killed in the explosion.
 March 24 – Air Caraïbes Flight 1501, a DHC-6 Twin Otter, crashes into a house whilst on approach into Saint Barthélemy Airport, Guadeloupe; all 19 passengers and crew, as well as one person on the ground, are killed.
 March 29 – In the 2001 Avjet Aspen crash, an Avjet charter flight, a Gulfstream III jet with 15 passengers and three crew, crashes on approach into Aspen, Colorado, killing all on board.
 May 17 – In the 2001 Faraz Qeshm Airlines Yak-40 crash, a Yakovlev Yak-40 crashes into mountains en route to Gorgan Airport, Iran amid poor weather conditions; all 30 passengers and crew are killed, including Iran's Minister of Roads and Transportation, Rahman Dadman.
 July 4 – Vladivostok Air Flight 352, a Tupolev Tu-154, enters a flat spin on approach to Irkutsk Airport in Irkutsk, Russia, crashes down onto its belly and bursts into flames in a wooded area, killing all 145 aboard.
 August 24 – Air Transat Flight 236, an Airbus A330, makes an emergency landing in the Azores after running out of fuel over the Atlantic Ocean; some tires blow out upon landing, causing a fire that is extinguished by emergency personnel on the ground; none of the 293 passengers or 13 crew on board the aircraft is seriously injured.
 August 29 – Binter Mediterráneo Flight 8261, a CASA CN-235, suffers port engine failure and crashes onto the N-340 road while attempting to make an emergency landing at Ruiz Picasso International Airport, killing four of 43 on board; the pilot initially survives, but dies several hours later.
 September 11 attacks:
 September 11 – American Airlines Flight 11, a Boeing 767-200ER with 92 people on board, is hijacked after taking off from Boston, and is flown into the north tower of the World Trade Center in New York City; all on board are killed as well as around 1600 people on the ground and in the building; the collapse of both towers brings the total death toll from the two crashes to at least 2,763, the deadliest disaster involving commercial aircraft.
 September 11 – United Airlines Flight 175, a Boeing 767-200 with 65 people on board, is hijacked after taking off from Boston and is flown into the south tower of the World Trade Center in New York City; all on board are killed as well as around 900 people on the ground and in the building; the collapse of both towers brings the total death toll from the two crashes to at least 2,763, the deadliest disaster involving commercial aircraft.
 September 11 – American Airlines Flight 77, a Boeing 757-200 with 64 people on board, is hijacked after taking off from Dulles International Airport and is flown into the Pentagon; all on board are killed as well as 125 people in the building and on the ground.
 September 11 – United Airlines Flight 93, a Boeing 757-200 with 44 people on board, is hijacked after taking off from Newark, New Jersey; passengers struggle with the hijackers, and the aircraft crashes in a field near Shanksville, Pennsylvania, killing all on board.
 September 15 – TAM Airlines Flight 9755, a Fokker 100 operating a domestic flight in Brazil, suffers an uncontained engine failure near Belo Horizonte; debris shatters three windows causing decompression of the aircraft; one passenger is partially blown out of the cabin and later dies, but the other 87 passengers and crew survive.
 October 4 – Siberia Airlines Flight 1812, a Tupolev Tu-154, is shot down by the Ukrainian military over the Black Sea; all 66 passengers and 12 crew members are killed.
 October 8 – In the Linate Airport disaster, Scandinavian Airlines System Flight 686, an MD-87, crashes into a Cessna business jet on takeoff from Milan, Italy, then swerves into a baggage handling building and catches fire; all 110 people on board the MD-87 and all four in the Cessna are killed, as well as four people on the ground.
 October 10 – Flightline Flight 101, a Fairchild Swearingen Metroliner, crashes into the Mediterranean Sea near the Columbretes Islands after a lightning strike, killing all 10 on board.
 November 12 – American Airlines Flight 587, an Airbus A300, crashes into a Queens neighborhood in New York City when the plane's vertical tail fin snaps off just after takeoff due to overuse of the rudder by the first officer during a wake turbulence encounter; all 251 passengers and nine crew members on board are killed as well as five people on the ground.
 November 24 – Crossair Flight 3597, an Avro RJ100, crashes near Bassersdorf, Switzerland, while attempting to land in Zürich; 24 of the 33 people on board lose their lives.
 December 22 – On board American Airlines Flight 63, a Boeing 767, a passenger, Richard Reid, attempts to detonate explosives hidden in his shoes, but fails and is subdued by two flight attendants and passengers; the aircraft lands safely in Boston.

2002 
 January 16 – Garuda Indonesia Flight 421, a Boeing 737-300, experiences a dual flameout after entering a thunderstorm, and crashes into the Bengawan Solo River in Indonesia; a flight attendant is killed but the other 59 people on board survive the accident.
 January 28 – TAME Flight 120, a Boeing 727, crashes into a volcano on approach to Tulcán, Ecuador, in low-visibility conditions; all 94 on board are killed.
 February 12 – Iran Air Tours Flight 956, a Tupolev Tu-154, crashes into the Sefid Kooh mountains during heavy rain, snow, and dense fog, while descending for Khorramabad Airport; all twelve crew members and 107 passengers are killed.
 April 15 – Air China Flight 129, a Boeing 767-200ER, crashes into a hill during a landing attempt at Busan, South Korea, in misty conditions; of the 155 passengers and 11 crew, 37 survive.
 May 4 – EAS Airlines Flight 4226, a BAC 1-11 500 series, crashes into the Gwammaja neighborhood at Kano, Nigeria, shortly after takeoff; the ensuing crash results in the deaths of 73 on board and at least 30 civilians on the ground.
 May 7 – EgyptAir Flight 843, a Boeing 737-566, crashes near Tunis, Tunisia, while landing in rough weather; of the 62 people on board, 14 die.
 May 7 – China Northern Airlines Flight 6136, a McDonnell Douglas MD-82, crashes near Dalian, China, after a passenger sets fire to the cabin with gasoline; all 103 passengers and nine crew are killed.
 May 25 – China Airlines Flight 611, a Boeing 747-200B, disintegrates above the Taiwan Strait in mid-flight due to maintenance error, killing all 225 people on board.
 July 1 – In the Überlingen mid-air collision, Bashkirian Airlines Flight 2937, a Tupolev Tu-154 with 60 passengers and nine crew members on board, collides with DHL Flight 611, a Boeing 757 freighter with two pilots on board near Lake Constance, Germany; all people on both planes die.
 July 4 – In the 2002 Prestige Airlines Boeing 707 crash, a Boeing 707, crashes at Bangui Airport in the Central African Republic while attempting an emergency landing, killing 28 of 30 on board.
 July 10 – Swiss International Air Lines Flight 850, a Saab 2000, strikes an earth bank after landing at Werneuchen Airfield, Germany, after multiple diversions due to a storm system; all 20 on board survive the accident but the aircraft is written off.
 July 26 – The 2002 Africa One Antonov An-26 crashes after aborting takeoff at Kinshasa-N'Djili Airport, Democratic Republic of the Congo; all 21 passengers and crew on board survive but the aircraft is written off.
 July 26 – FedEx Express Flight 1478, a Boeing 727, crashes during landing at Tallahassee International Airport, Florida; all three crew members survive but the aircraft is written off.
 July 28 – Pulkovo Aviation Enterprise Flight 9560, an Ilyushin Il-86 on a re-positioning flight, crashes after takeoff from Sheremetyevo International Airport in Moscow, Russia, killing 14 out of 16 crew members on board.
 August 22 – In the 2002 Shangri-La Air Twin Otter crash, a DHC-6 Twin Otter crashes in thick cloud whilst on approach into Pokhara Airport, Nepal, killing all 18 passengers and crew.

 August 30 – Rico Linhas Aéreas Flight 4823, an Embraer EMB 120 Brasília, crashes on approach to Rio Branco International Airport, Brazil, in a rainstorm; the aircraft breaks up into three pieces and catches fire; 23 of 31 on board die.
 September 14 – Total Linhas Aéreas Flight 5561, an ATR 42, crashes near Paranapanema, São Paulo, Brazil, due to a pitch trim control system failure, killing both pilots.
 October 9 – Northwest Airlines Flight 85, a Boeing 747, experiences a rudder hardover; the crew make an emergency landing at Ted Stevens Anchorage International Airport and all 404 people on board are unharmed.
 November 6 – Luxair Flight 9642, a Fokker F50, crashes short of the runway on approach to Luxembourg Findel Airport in foggy weather conditions; of the 19 passengers and three crew on board, only two survive.
 November 11 – Laoag International Airlines Flight 585, a Fokker F-27 Friendship, crashes into Manila Bay shortly after takeoff from Ninoy Aquino International Airport; of the 34 people on board, 19 are killed.
 December 21 – TransAsia Airways Flight 791, an ATR 72-200 operating a cargo flight from Taipei to Macau, crashes into the sea near Penghu, Taiwan, killing both pilots.
 December 23 – Aeromist-Kharkiv Flight 2137, an Antonov An-140, crashes near Ardestan in Iran whilst descending into Isfahan International Airport, claiming the lives of all 44 on board; the accident is found to have been caused by insufficient crew training.

2003 

 January 8 – Air Midwest Flight 5481, a Beechcraft 1900, crashes on takeoff from Charlotte, North Carolina, United States; all 19 passengers and two pilots are killed.
 January 8 – Turkish Airlines Flight 634, an Avro RJ100, crashes during its final approach to land at Diyarbakır Airport, Turkey, in extensive fog. All of the five crew and 70 of the 75 passengers are killed, five passengers survive with serious injuries.
 January 9 – TANS Perú Flight 222, a Fokker F28, crashes while on approach to Chachapoyas Airport; all 46 on board die.
 March 6 – Air Algérie Flight 6289, a Boeing 737-200, veers off the runway on takeoff in Tamanrasset, Algeria; 96 of the 97 passengers and all six crew members die.
 May 8 – In the 2003 Congo air disaster, a Ukrainian Cargo Airways Ilyushin Il-76 suffers a rapid decompression after a cargo door opens mid-flight. The aircraft manages to return to Kinshasa, but not before between 17 and 200 civilians are sucked out to their deaths (casualty numbers vary depending on source).
 May 25 – A Boeing 727-200 is stolen from Quatro de Fevereiro Airport in Angola, possibly by two men known to the authorities, and disappears over the Atlantic Ocean; despite an extensive search effort, the aircraft has never been found.
 May 26 – UM Airlines Flight 4230, a Yakovlev Yak-42 crashes into the side of a mountain near the town of Maçka, Turkey. All 75 people are killed.
 May 29 – A man attempts to hijack Qantas Flight 1737, a Boeing 717, in Melbourne, Australia, intending to crash the plane in Tasmania. He is overpowered by the flight crew and passengers, but injures three people.
 June 22 – Air France Flight 5672, a Bombardier CRJ100ER operating a domestic flight from Nantes to Brest in France, crashes on approach to Brest-Guipavas Airport due to pilot error, killing one of the 24 people on board.
 July 8 – Sudan Airways Flight 139, a Boeing 737-200, crashes shortly after taking off from Port Sudan, Sudan. 116 of the 117 people on board the plane die; a two-year-old boy is the sole survivor.
 August 24 – Tropical Airways Flight 1301, a Let L-410 Turbolet operating a domestic flight in Haiti, crashes into a field shortly after taking off from Cap-Haïtien International Airport, due to a cargo door failure; all 21 people on board are killed.
 August 26 – Colgan Air Flight 9446, a Beech 1900D crashes into the sea just after taking off from Barnstable Municipal Airport, Massachusetts. Both pilots are killed.
 November 22 – A DHL Airbus A300 is struck by a missile near Baghdad, Iraq and loses hydraulic system function, but manages to land safely with only engine controls without any fatalities. This is the first non-fatal landing of an airliner without control surfaces.
 December 18 – FedEx Express Flight 647, a McDonnell Douglas MD-10-10, veers off the runway upon landing after a landing gear collapse and catches fire at Memphis International Airport; two crew members and five passengers escape with only minor injuries.
 December 25 – UTA Flight 141, a Boeing 727, runs off the end of the runway upon takeoff at Cotonou, Benin, and crashes onto the beach on the Bight of Benin, killing 138 of the 160 occupants and three people on the ground.

2004 

 January 3 – Flash Airlines Flight 604, a Boeing 737-300, crashes into the Red Sea, killing all 135 passengers and 13 crew members in the worst ever accident involving the 737-300.
 January 13 – Uzbekistan Airways Flight 1154, a Yakovlev Yak-40 collides with a radar station on approach into Tashkent International Airport, Uzbekistan in poor weather. All 37 passengers and crew are killed.
 February 10 – Kish Air Flight 7170, a Fokker 50, crashes at Sharjah International Airport, killing 43 people. Three survive with serious injuries.
 May 14 – Rico Linhas Aéreas Flight 4815, an Embraer 120ER, crashes while on approach to Eduardo Gomes International Airport, killing all 33 passengers and crew on board; the cause is never determined.
 June 8 – Gabon Express Flight 221, a Hawker Siddeley HS 748 crashes into the sea after attempting an emergency landing at Libreville International Airport, Gabon after an engine failure. 19 of the 30 passengers and crew are killed.
 August 13 – Air Tahoma Flight 185, a Convair 580, crashes near Covington, Kentucky, while descending to land, killing the first officer.
 2004 Russian aircraft bombings:
 August 24 – Siberia Airlines Flight 1047, a Tupolev Tu-154, explodes in mid-air while flying over Rostov Oblast, Russia, killing all 38 passengers and eight crew members on board.
 August 24 – Volga-AviaExpress Flight 1303, a Tupolev Tu-134, explodes in mid-air while flying over Tula Oblast, Russia, killing all 34 passengers and nine crew members on board.

 October 14 – MK Airlines Flight 1602, a Boeing 747-200F, crashes on takeoff from Halifax Stanfield International Airport, killing all seven on board.
 October 14 – Pinnacle Airlines Flight 3701, a CRJ-200 on a repositioning flight with no passengers, crashes near Jefferson City, Missouri, killing both pilots.
 October 19 – Corporate Airlines Flight 5966, a British Aerospace Jetstream, crashes near Kirksville, Missouri, United States; 13 of the 15 people on board die.
 November 21 – China Eastern Airlines Flight 5210, a Bombardier CRJ200, stalls and crashes near Baotou, China, shortly after takeoff because of frost contamination; all 53 on board and two people on the ground are killed.
 November 30 – Lion Air Flight 583, a McDonnell Douglas MD-82, crash-lands in Solo City, Indonesia, killing 25 of the 154 people on board.

2005 

 February 3 – Kam Air Flight 904, a Boeing 737-200, crashes in a snowstorm in Afghanistan. All 96 passengers and eight crew members die.
 February 20 – British Airways Flight 268, a Boeing 747-400, taking off from Los Angeles to London suffers fire in engine 2. The plane flies on three engines to Manchester, where it performs an emergency landing. None of the 369 people on board are harmed.
 March 6 – Air Transat Flight 961, an Airbus A310, suffers rudder failure after takeoff from Varadero, Cuba; the aircraft returns to Cuba with no casualties.
 March 16 – Regional Airlines Flight 9288, an Antonov An-24RV, stalls and crashes into a small hill near Varandey Airport, Russia, due to a possible instrument failure, killing 28 of 52 on board.
 March 25 – West Caribbean Airways Flight 9955, a Let L-410 Turbolet operating a domestic flight in Colombia, South America, stalls due to engine failure and crashes into a forest shortly after departing from El Embrujo Airport on Providencia Island, killing nine of the 14 people on board.
 May 3 – Airwork Flight 23, a Fairchild SA227-AC Metro III operating a cargo flight between the north and south islands of New Zealand, breaks up in mid-air and crashes in Stratford, North Island, due to pilot error, killing the two crew members on board.
 May 7 – In the Lockhart River air disaster, an Aero-Tropics Air Services Fairchild Swearingen Metroliner operating on behalf of Transair strikes terrain on approach into Lockhart River Airport, Australia. All 15 passengers and crew are killed.
 June 9 – In the 2005 Logan Airport runway incursion, US Airways Flight 1170, a Boeing 737, and Aer Lingus Flight 132, an Airbus A330, almost collide on a runway at Logan International Airport in Boston, Massachusetts. None of the 381 people on either plane is harmed.
 July 16 – An Equatorial Express Antonov An-24 crashes into a mountainside near Baney in Equatorial Guinea, killing all 60 people on board.
 August 2 – Air France Flight 358, an Airbus A340-300, skids off a runway at Toronto Pearson International Airport, Ontario, while landing and catches fire; all 309 on board escape without fatalities, 43 people are injured, the aircraft is completely destroyed by the fire.
 August 6 – Tuninter Flight 1153, an ATR 72, ditches into the Mediterranean Sea near Palermo, Sicily, with 35 passengers and four crew members on board; 14 passengers and two crew members die.
 August 10 – Copterline Flight 103, a Sikorsky S-76 helicopter crashes off Tallinn, Estonia, killing all 14 on board.
 August 14 – Helios Airways Flight 522, a Boeing 737-300, crashes near Kalamos, Greece, with 115 passengers and six crew members on board; there are no survivors.
 August 16 – West Caribbean Airways Flight 708, a McDonnell Douglas MD-82, crashes in western Venezuela. All on board, 152 passengers and eight crew members, die.
 August 23 – TANS Perú Flight 204, a Boeing 737-200, crashes on approach to Captain Rolden International Airport, Pucallpa, Peru. Thirty-five of the 91 passengers on board, as well as five of the seven crew members, die.
 September 5 – Mandala Airlines Flight 091, a Boeing 737-200, crashes in Medan, Indonesia, killing 103 of the 111 passengers and all five crew members on board the aircraft and an additional 47 people on the ground.
 September 5 – A Kavatshi Airlines Antonov An-26B crashes at Isiro Airport in Matari, Democratic Republic of the Congo, killing all 11 people on board.
 September 9 – An Air Kasaï Antonov An-26B crashes in the Republic of the Congo north of Brazzaville, killing all 13 people on board.
 September 21 – JetBlue Flight 292, an Airbus A320, makes an emergency landing at Los Angeles International Airport because of landing gear steering failure. There are no injuries to the 139 passengers and six crew members.
 October 22 – Bellview Airlines Flight 210, a Boeing 737-200, crashes shortly after takeoff from Murtala Muhammed International Airport in Lagos, Nigeria, killing all 117 people on board.
 December 8 – Southwest Airlines Flight 1248, a Boeing 737-700, slides off the runway during landing at Chicago Midway International Airport in Chicago in heavy snow. None of the people on board are injured, but the plane hits two automobiles on the ground, killing a passenger.
 December 10 – Sosoliso Airlines Flight 1145, a McDonnell Douglas DC-9 with 110 people on board, crashes during landing in Port Harcourt, Nigeria. Of the 110 people on board; only two survive.
 December 19 – Chalk's Ocean Airways Flight 101, a Grumman Mallard, crashes off the coast of Miami Beach, Florida, killing all 20 on board.
 December 23 – Azerbaijan Airlines Flight 217, an Antonov An-140, crashes shortly after takeoff from Baku Airport due to instrument failure, killing all 23 on board.

2006 

 March 31 – TEAM Linhas Aéreas Flight 6865, a Let L-410 Turbolet crashes whilst conducting a VFR approach to Macaé Airport, Brazil. All 19 passengers and crew are killed.
 April 10 – 2006 Kenya plane crash, a Kenya Air Force Harbin Y-12 crashed as it approached Marsabit air strip killing 14 passengers, including a number of politicians.
 May 3 – Armavia Flight 967, an Airbus A320, crashes into the Black Sea near the Russian city of Sochi, killing all 113 on board.
 June 21 – In the 2006 Yeti Airlines Twin Otter Crash, a DHC-6 Twin Otter crashes during a go-around at Jumla Airport, Nepal. All nine passengers and crew are killed.
 July 9 – S7 Airlines Flight 778, an Airbus A310, crashes into a concrete barricade at Irkutsk International Airport, Russia, upon landing and catches fire. Of the 203 people on board, 125 are killed.
 July 10 – Pakistan International Airlines Flight 688, a Fokker F27, crashes into a wheat field near Multan, Pakistan, ten minutes after taking off, killing all 41 passengers and four crew members on board.
 July 28 – FedEx Flight 630, a McDonnell Douglas MD-10, crashes on landing at Memphis International Airport, Tennessee, after the left main landing gear collapses shortly after touchdown, all three crew members are seriously injured.
 August 13 – Air Algérie Flight 2208, a Lockheed L‑100 Hercules in Northern Italy crashes as a result of an autopilot malfunction. All three on board are killed.
 August 22 – Pulkovo Aviation Enterprise Flight 612, a Tupolev Tu-154, crashes near Donetsk, Ukraine, killing all 170 people on board.
 August 27 – Comair Flight 5191, a Bombardier Canadair CRJ-100, crashes on takeoff at Blue Grass Airport, Kentucky, due to runway confusion; of the 50 people on board, only the first officer survives.
 September 1 – Iran Air Tours Flight 945, a Tupolev Tu-154, crashes while attempting to land in Mashad, Iran, killing 28 of 154 on board.
 September 29 – Gol Transportes Aéreos Flight 1907, a Boeing 737-800, collides with an Embraer Legacy business jet and crashes in Mato Grosso, Brazil; the Embraer Legacy, with seven on board, lands safely with no reported injuries while all 154 people on board the Boeing 737 die; this crash marks the first loss of a Boeing 737-800.
 October 3 – Turkish Airlines Flight 1476, a Boeing 737, is hijacked in Greek airspace. The plane landed at Brindisi Airport, Italy, where the hijacker was arrested. All 113 people on board survive.

 October 10 – Atlantic Airways Flight 670, a BAe 146, slides off the runway at Stord Airport, Norway, due to hydroplaning and brake failure, killing four of the 16 people on board.
 October 28 – Continental Airlines Flight 1883, a Boeing 757, accidentally lands on a taxiway at Newark Liberty International Airport, New Jersey, none of the 154 people on board are injured.
 October 29 – ADC Airlines Flight 053, a Boeing 737-200, crashes near Abuja, Nigeria, after encountering wind shear, killing 96 of the 105 people on board.

2007 

 January 1 – Adam Air Flight 574, a Boeing 737-400 with 102 people on board, crashes into the ocean off the island of Sulawesi in Indonesia, killing all on board in the worst ever crash involving the 737-400.
 January 9 – An AerianTur-M Antonov An-26 crashes near Balad, Iraq, killing 34 of the 35 people on board. The official cause of the crash is poor weather conditions, but other sources claim that the plane was shot down by a missile.
 January 24 – Air West Flight 612, a Boeing 737, is hijacked shortly after takeoff. The plane landed safely at N'Djamena International Airport, where the hijacker surrendered. All 103 people on board survive.
 February 21 – Adam Air Flight 172, a Boeing 737-300, suffers structural damage while landing near Surabaya, Indonesia; none of the 149 people on board are seriously injured.
 March 7 – Garuda Indonesia Flight 200, a Boeing 737-400, overshoots the runway and crashes while landing at Yogyakarta, Indonesia, killing 21 of the 140 people on board.
 March 17 – UTair Flight 471, a Tupolev Tu-134, suffers severe structural damage while landing in Samara, Russia, killing six of the 63 people on board.
 March 23 – The 2007 Mogadishu TransAVIAexport Airlines Il-76 crash of an Ilyushin Il-76 near Mogadishu, Somalia, after being hit by a surface-to-air missile, kills all 11 on board; one passenger initially survives, but dies hours later.
 May 5 – Kenya Airways Flight 507, a Boeing 737-800 with 114 people on board, crashes near Douala, Cameroon, killing all on board.
 June 3 – In the 2007 Paramount Airlines Mil Mi-8 crash, a Mil Mi-8 helicopter crashes in Lungi, Sierra Leone, killing all 22 people on board.
 June 21 – The 2007 Free Airlines L-410 crash shortly after takeoff from Kamina Town, Democratic Republic of Congo because of severe overloading, kills one and injures four of the 21 people on board.
 June 25 – PMTair Flight 241, an Antonov An-24, crashes in southwestern Cambodia, killing all 22 on board.

 July 17 – TAM Airlines Flight 3054, an Airbus A320, crashes at Congonhas-São Paulo Airport, Brazil, killing all 187 people on board and 12 on the ground.
 August 9 – Air Moorea Flight 1121, a de Havilland Canada DHC-6, crashes into the lagoon of the island of Moorea in French Polynesia just 11 seconds after takeoff, killing all 20 on board.
 August 20 – China Airlines Flight 120, a Boeing 737-800, bursts into flames after landing at Naha, Japan; none of the 165 passengers on board are seriously injured.
 August 26 – A Great Lakes Business Company Antonov An-32B crashes short of the runway after experiencing engine failure and attempting to return to Kongolo Airport in Kongolo, Democratic Republic of the Congo, killing 14 of the 15 people on board.
 Scandinavian Airlines System Dash 8 landing gear incidents:
 September 9 – Scandinavian Airlines System Flight 1209, a de Havilland Canada Dash 8, experiences a landing gear failure in Aalborg, Denmark; none of the 73 people on board is seriously injured, but three days later, after a similar incident, the airline grounds the aircraft type.
 September 12 – Scandinavian Airlines System Flight 2748, a de Havilland Canada Dash 8, experiences a landing gear failure in Vilnius, Lithuania; none of the 52 people on board is injured, but because of a similar incident three days earlier, all their Dash 8s are grounded.
 October 27 – Scandinavian Airlines System Flight 2867, a de Havilland Canada Dash 8, experiences a landing gear failure in Copenhagen, Denmark; none of the 44 people on board is injured, but because of similar incidents in September, the airline "permanently" removes its Dash 8s from service; cause is eventually ascribed to maintenance error.

 September 16 – One-Two-GO Airlines Flight 269, a McDonnell Douglas MD-82 carrying 130 people, crashes and bursts into flames after attempting to land in Phuket, Thailand, during poor weather conditions, killing 90 people.
 October 4 – The 2007 Africa One Antonov An-26 crashes into a residential area in Kinshasa, Democratic Republic of the Congo, shortly after taking off, kills at least 50 people, most of whom are on the ground.
 November 30 – Atlasjet Flight 4203, a McDonnell Douglas MD-83, crashes into a mountain near Isparta, Turkey, killing all 57 on board.
 December 30 – TAROM Flight 3107, a Boeing 737-300, is written-off after hitting a maintenance car on the runway and veering off the runway during takeoff run at Henri Coandă International Airport, Otopeni, Romania; none of the 123 on board is injured.

2008 

 January 4 – The 2008 Los Roques archipelago Transaven Let L-410 crash kills all 14 on board.
 January 17 – British Airways Flight 38, a Boeing 777-200ER, lands short of the runway at London Heathrow Airport due to a fuel system problem; all 152 on board survive. This is the first loss of a Boeing 777-200ER, and the first loss of any 777 due to an operational incident.
 February 8 – Eagle Airways Flight 2279, a BAe Jetstream 32, is hijacked 10 minutes after taking off from Blenheim, New Zealand by a passenger who attacks both pilots. The hijacker is eventually restrained by the co-pilot and the flight lands safely at Christchurch. All nine on board survive the incident.
 February 14 – Belavia Flight 1834, a Bombardier CRJ100, hits its left wing on the runway while taking off from Yerevan, Armenia. All 21 on board escape the aircraft before it erupts into flames.
 February 21 – Santa Bárbara Airlines Flight 518, an ATR 42-300, crashes shortly after taking off from Mérida, Venezuela, killing all 46 on board.
 April 3 – In the 2008 Blue Wing Airlines An-28 crash, an Antonov An-28 operated by Blue Wing Airlines crashes near Benzdorp in Suriname. All 19 on board are killed.
 April 11 – Kata Air Transport Flight 007, a Sudanese airline Antonov An-32 crashes when returning shortly after taking off from Chişinău International Airport, Moldova, for Turkey. All eight on board are killed.
 April 15 – Hewa Bora Airways Flight 122, a McDonnell Douglas DC-9, crashes into a market near Goma, Democratic Republic of the Congo, killing 40 people, including three passengers.
 May 25 – Kalitta Air Flight 207, a Boeing 747-200, overruns the runway at Brussels, Belgium. No one is injured but the aircraft is written off.
 May 26 – Moskovia Airlines Flight 9675, a Moskovia Airlines Antonov An-12 crashes shortly after takeoff from Chelyabinsk Airport, Russia due to an onboard fire. All nine crew members are killed.
 May 30 – TACA Flight 390, an Airbus A320, overruns the runway at Toncontín International Airport in Tegucigalpa, Honduras, killing five (including two on ground).
 June 10 – Sudan Airways Flight 109, an Airbus A310, crashes at Khartoum International Airport and breaks apart, catching fire. 30 deaths are confirmed, six passengers are listed as missing.
 July 7 – Centurion Air Cargo Flight 164, a Boeing 747-200BSF operated by Kalitta Air, crashes shortly after taking off from Bogota's El Dorado International Airport, Colombia due to an engine failure. All eight crew survive, but two on the ground are killed.
 July 25 – Qantas Flight 30, a Boeing 747-400 en route from Hong Kong to Melbourne, performs an emergency descent and lands in Manila after a hull penetration results in rapid decompression; all aboard survive.
 August 20 – Spanair Flight 5022, a McDonnell Douglas MD-82, crashes on takeoff at Barajas Airport in Madrid, Spain. Of the 172 people on board, 154 are killed.
 August 24 – In the 2008 Aéreo Ruta Maya crash, a Cessna 208 Caravan, crashes 45 minutes after takeoff from La Aurora International Airport, Guatemala en route to El Estor, Guatemala. 11 of the 14 passengers and crew are killed.
 August 24 – Iran Aseman Airlines Flight 6895, a Boeing 737, crashes just after takeoff from Manas Airport in Bishkek, Kyrgyzstan. 68 of the 90 passengers and crew on board are killed.
 August 27 – Sriwijaya Air Flight 062, a Boeing 737-200 overruns the runway at Sultan Thaha Airport, Indonesia during a landing attempt, resulting in 26 injuries (14 of them serious). One person on the ground later dies from their injuries.
 August 30 – In the 2008 Conviasa Boeing 737 crash, a Boeing 737-200 crashes into Illiniza, Ecuador whilst en route to Cotopaxi International Airport, Ecuador. All three on board are killed.
 September 14 – Aeroflot Flight 821, a Boeing 737, crashes on approach to Perm Airport from Moscow due to pilot error, killing all 88 people on board in the worst ever accident involving the Boeing 737-500.
 October 7 – Qantas Flight 72, an Airbus A330-300, makes an emergency landing in Exmouth, Australia, following a rapid descent that leaves over 70 people injured, 14 of them seriously.
 October 8 – Yeti Airlines Flight 103, a de Havilland Canada DHC-6 Twin Otter, crashes  from Mt Everest, Nepal, killing 18 of 19 people on board.
 November 10 – Ryanair Flight 4102, a Boeing 737, suffers up to 90 bird strikes on its final approach to Rome Ciampino Airport, damaging landing gear and both engines. The aircraft lands safely; 10 of the 172 on board are treated for minor injuries.
 November 27 – XL Airways Germany Flight 888T, an Airbus A320, crashes into the Mediterranean Sea on approach into Perpignan-Rivesaltes Airport, France. All seven on board are killed.

 December 20 – Continental Airlines Flight 1404, a Boeing 737-500 with 115 people on board, veers off the runway upon takeoff from Denver International Airport, comes to rest in a ravine near the runway and catches fire; 38 people are injured.

2009 

 January 15 – US Airways Flight 1549, an Airbus A320 bound for Charlotte, North Carolina, ditches in the Hudson River shortly after taking off from LaGuardia Airport, New York City, due to total engine failure caused by multiple bird strikes; all 155 people on board survive the accident.
 January 27 – Empire Airlines Flight 8284, an ATR 42-300 operating a FedEx cargo flight in Texas, United States, crashes on approach to Lubbock Preston Smith International Airport due to pilot error; the two pilots on board survive the accident but the aircraft is destroyed.
 February 7 – A Manaus Aerotáxi Embraer EMB 110 crashes in the Amazon basin near Santo António, Brazil, due to overloading, killing 24 of the 28 people on board.
 February 12 – Colgan Air Flight 3407, a Bombardier Dash 8 Q400 flying from Newark, New Jersey, to Buffalo, New York, United States, crashes into a house in Clarence Center, New York state, killing all 49 on board the aircraft and one person on the ground.
 February 25 – Turkish Airlines Flight 1951, a Boeing 737-800 flying from Istanbul, Turkey, to Amsterdam, Netherlands, stalls and crashes into a field during final approach to Schiphol Airport, killing nine of the 135 people on board.
 March 20 – Emirates Flight 407, an Airbus A340-500 en route from Auckland, New Zealand, to Dubai, United Arab Emirates, suffers a tailstrike when attempting to take off from its intermediate stopover at Melbourne's Tullamarine Airport; the aircraft returns to the airport with no casualties.
 March 23 – FedEx Express Flight 80, a McDonnell Douglas MD-11 operating a cargo flight from Guangzhou, China, to Narita, Japan, crashes while attempting to land at Tokyo Narita International Airport, killing the two crew members on board the flight.
 April 9 – An Aviastar BAe 146-300 crashes into Pikei Hill during a domestic cargo flight from Jayapura to Wamena, Indonesia, killing all 6 crew members on board.
 April 17 – Mimika Air Flight 514, a Pilatus PC-6 operating a domestic flight in Western New Guinea, Indonesia, crashes into Mount Gergaji due to pilot error, killing all 11 people on board.
 April 19 – CanJet Flight 918, a Boeing 737 operating a flight from Montego Bay, Jamaica, bound for Halifax, Canada, is seized on the ground before takeoff by a lone gunman; all 174 passengers are quickly released, but six crew members are taken hostage for several hours before being freed unharmed.
 June 1 – Air France Flight 447, an Airbus A330 flying from Rio de Janeiro, Brazil, to Paris, France, crashes in the Atlantic Ocean, killing all 228 people on board; bodies and aircraft debris are recovered within days but the main fuselage and the black boxes are not found until 2011; this remains the deadliest accident involving the A330.
 June 30 – Yemenia Flight 626, an Airbus A310 flying from Sanaa, Yemen, to Moroni, Comoros, crashes into the Indian Ocean on approach to Prince Said Ibrahim International Airport due to pilot error; all but one of the 153 occupants are killed, the sole survivor being a 12-year-old girl who is found clinging to the wreckage.
 July 13 – Southwest Airlines Flight 2294, a Boeing 737 en route from Nashville, Tennessee, to Baltimore, Maryland, United States, makes an emergency landing in Charleston, West Virginia, after a large hole opens in the skin of the fuselage at  causing a loss of cabin pressure; the aircraft lands safely and no-one is injured.
 July 15 – Caspian Airlines Flight 7908, a Tupolev Tu-154 flying from Tehran, Iran, to Yerevan, Armenia, crashes 16 minutes after takeoff due to uncontained engine failure, killing all 168 people on board.
 July 24 – Aria Air Flight 1525, an Ilyushin Il-62 operating a domestic flight in Iran, overshoots the runway while attempting to land at Mashhad International Airport, killing 16 of the 173 on board.
 August 2 – Merpati Nusantara Airlines Flight 9760, a de Havilland Canada DHC-6 Twin Otter operating a domestic flight in the Indonesian province of Papua, crashes into a mountain on approach to Oksibil Airport in good weather, due to pilot error; all 15 people on board are killed.
 August 4 – Bangkok Airways Flight 266, an ATR 72-200 operating a domestic flight in Thailand, crashes while attempting to land at Samui Airport on Ko Samui island, resulting in at least one confirmed death and 37 injuries amongst the 72 people on board.
 August 11 – Airlines PNG Flight 4684, a de Havilland Canada DHC-6 Twin Otter operating a domestic flight in southeastern Papua New Guinea, crashes into mountainous terrain while on approach to Kokoda Airport due to poor visibility; all 13 people on board die in the accident.
 August 26 – An Aéro-Frêt Antonov An-12 crashes whilst en route to Maya-Maya Airport, Brazzaville, Republic of the Congo, after breaking up in mid-air as a result of an inflight fire; all six occupants of the aircraft are killed.
 September 9 – Aeroméxico Flight 576, a Boeing 737 flying from Cancún to Mexico City, Mexico, is hijacked by a Bolivian man carrying a fake explosive device; after landing in Mexico City, the aircraft is stormed by officials and all 107 passengers and crew are released unharmed.
 September 24 – Airlink Flight 8911, a BAe Jetstream 41 operating a domestic flight in South Africa, crashes into a school shortly after taking off from Durban International Airport; the pilot dies two weeks later from injuries sustained in the crash.
 October 21 – Azza Transport Flight 2241, a Boeing 707 bound for Khartoum, Sudan, crashes on takeoff from Sharjah International Airport, United Arab Emirates, due to pilot error; all six on board the aircraft are killed.
 November 12 – RwandAir Flight 205, a Bombardier CRJ-100 bound for Entebbe, Uganda, crashes into a terminal building at Kigali International Airport in Rwanda shortly after returning for an emergency landing due to difficulties with the flight controls; one of the 10 passengers is killed.
 November 28 – Avient Aviation Flight 324, a McDonnell Douglas MD-11F bound for Manas International Airport, Kyrgyzstan, overshoots the runway during takeoff at Shanghai Pudong International Airport, China, killing three of the seven crew members on board.
 December 22 – American Airlines Flight 331, a Boeing 737-800 operating a flight from the United States to Kingston, Jamaica, overshoots the runway on landing at Norman Manley International Airport due to pilot error; there are multiple injuries amongst the 154 people on board.
 December 25 – Northwest Airlines Flight 253, an Airbus A330-300 flying from Amsterdam Airport Schiphol, Netherlands, to Detroit Metropolitan Airport, Michigan, United States, is attacked by a man using a small explosive device, causing a small onboard fire; the perpetrator is subdued by passengers and crew, and the fire quickly extinguished.

2010s

2010 

 January 21 – Cargolux Flight 7933, a Boeing 747-4R7F operating a multi-leg cargo flight from Hong Kong to Luxembourg, collides with a ground vehicle on landing at Luxembourg Findel Airport due to ATC error; the driver of the ground vehicle is injured in the accident.
 January 24 – Taban Air Flight 6437, a Tupolev Tu-154M operating a domestic flight in Iran, crashes while making an emergency landing at Mashhad International Airport; all 157 passengers and 13 crew survive the accident with 47 receiving minor injuries.
 January 25 – Ethiopian Airlines Flight 409, a Boeing 737-800 bound for the Ethiopian capital, Addis Ababa, crashes into the Mediterranean Sea shortly after takeoff from Beirut Rafic Hariri International Airport; all 90 people on board die.
 March 22 – Aviastar-TU Flight 1906, a Tupolev Tu-204 flying from Hurghada, Egypt, to Moscow, Russia, crashes on landing at Domodedovo International Airport in foggy weather; all eight crew on board survive, but the aircraft is written off; this is the first loss of the Tu-204.

 April 13 – AeroUnion Flight 302, an Airbus A300B4F operating a cargo flight from Mexico City, crashes on a missed approach to Monterrey International Airport, Mexico; all five crew members are killed, as well as one person on the ground.
 April 13 – Merpati Nusantara Airlines Flight 836, a Boeing 737 operating a domestic flight in Indonesia, overshoots the runway at Rendani Airport; all 103 people on board survive, but three are seriously injured.
 April 13 – Cathay Pacific Flight 780, an Airbus A330 flying from Juanda International Airport, Indonesia, to Hong Kong, lands safely after the engine thrust controls malfunction due to contaminated fuel; 57 of the 309 passengers are injured in the evacuation; the two pilots receive the IFALPA Polaris Award for their heroism and airmanship.
 May 12 – Afriqiyah Airways Flight 771, an Airbus A330 that has flown from Johannesburg, South Africa, crashes on landing at Tripoli International Airport, Libya, killing all but one of the 104 people on board; the sole survivor is a child from the Netherlands.
 May 17 – Pamir Airways Flight 112, an Antonov An-24 operating a domestic flight in Afghanistan, crashes shortly after taking off from Kunduz Airport; all 39 passengers and five crew lose their lives.
 May 22 –Air India Express Flight 812, a Boeing 737-800 flying from Dubai, United Arab Emirates, to Mangalore, India, crashes after overshooting the runway at Mangalore International Airport; 158 of the 166 people on board are killed.
 June 19 – A CASA C-212 Aviocar crashes near Djoum, Cameroon, while operating a charter flight to Yangadou, Republic of the Congo; all 11 occupants are killed, including the entire board of Sundance Resources, an Australian mining conglomerate.
 June 19 – An Air Service Berlin Douglas C-47 Skytrain crashes due to engine failure shortly after taking off from Berlin Schönefeld Airport, Germany, for a sightseeing flight over Berlin; 7 of the 28 on board are injured in the accident.
 July 27 – Lufthansa Cargo Flight 8460, a McDonnell Douglas MD-11 operating a multi-leg flight from Frankfurt, Germany, to Hong Kong in southern China, crashes on landing at King Khalid International Airport in Saudi Arabia; both occupants of the aircraft survive the incident.
 July 28 – Airblue Flight 202, an Airbus A321 operating a domestic flight in Pakistan, crashes in the Margalla Hills northeast of Islamabad, resulting in the deaths of 146 passengers and six crew members; it is the first fatal accident involving an Airbus A321 and Pakistan's worst air disaster.
 August 3 – Katekavia Flight 9357, an Antonov An-24 operating a domestic flight in Russia, crashes on approach to Igarka Airport in Krasnoyarsk Krai, killing 12 of the 15 people on board.
 August 16 – AIRES Flight 8250, a Boeing 737 operating a domestic flight in Colombia, splits apart after a hard landing at Gustavo Rojas Pinilla Airport in San Andrés; of the 125 passengers and six crew members on board, two passengers are killed and another 113 injured.
 August 24 – Agni Air Flight 101, a Dornier Do 228 operating a domestic flight in Nepal, crashes near Shikharpur in heavy rain, shortly after departing from Kathmandu, killing all 14 people on board.
 August 24 – Henan Airlines Flight 8387, an Embraer E-190 operating a domestic flight in China, overshoots the runway and crashes at Yichun, Heilongjiang, killing 44 of the 91 passengers and five crew members; this is the first hull loss of an Embraer E-Jet.
 August 25 – A Filair Let L-410 Turbolet crashes on approach to Bandundu Airport, Democratic Republic of the Congo, killing all but one of the 21 on board.
 September 3 – UPS Airlines Flight 6, a Boeing 747-400 flying from Dubai, United Arab Emirates, to Cologne, Germany, crashes at a military base shortly after takeoff, killing both crew members.
 September 7 – Alrosa Flight 514, a Tupolev Tu-154M operating a domestic flight in Russia, makes a successful emergency landing at Izhma Airport after suffering in-flight electrical failure; the aircraft overshoots the runway after landing but all 81 passengers and crew survive the incident.
 September 13 – Conviasa Flight 2350, an ATR-42 operating a domestic flight in Venezuela, crashes shortly before landing at Guayana International Airport, killing 17 of the 51 people on board.
 November 4 – Aero Caribbean Flight 883, an ATR-72 bound from Haiti to Cuba, crashes in the central Cuban province of Sancti Spíritus, killing all 68 on board in one of the worst-ever accidents involving the ATR 72.
 November 4 – Qantas Flight 32, an Airbus A380 flying from London's Heathrow Airport to Sydney, Australia, suffers an uncontained engine failure after taking off from Singapore's Changi Airport; upon turning back, the flight lands safely and all 469 people on board are unharmed.
 November 5 – JS Air Flight 201, a Beechcraft 1900 operating a domestic charter flight in Pakistan, crashes immediately after takeoff from Jinnah International Airport, Karachi, due to an engine malfunction; all 21 people on board are killed.
 November 11 – A Tarco Airlines Antonov An-24 crashes on landing at Zalingei Airport, Sudan, killing six of the 44 on board.
 November 28 – Sun Way Flight 4412, an Ilyushin Il-76TD flying from Karachi, Pakistan, to Khartoum, Sudan, suffers an engine fire and crashes near Jinnah International Airport, killing all eight crew on board and another four on the ground.
 December 4 – Dagestan Airlines Flight 372, a Tupolev Tu-154 operating a domestic flight in Russia, skids off the runway during an emergency landing at Domodedovo International Airport, killing two of the 160 passengers on board and injuring 87.
 December 15 – A Tara Air DHC-6 Twin Otter crashes in the Bilandu Forest near Shreechaur, Okhaldhunga District, Nepal, killing all 22 passengers and crew on board.

2011 

 January 1 – Kolavia Flight 348, a Tupolev Tu-154, erupts in flames while taxiing at Surgut International Airport, Russia, killing three out of 124 people and injuring 43.
 January 9 – Iran Air Flight 277, a Boeing 727, crashes at Urmia Airport, Iran, during a go-around, killing 77 of 105 people on board.
 February 10 – Manx2 Flight 7100, a Fairchild Metroliner III, crashes at Cork Airport, Republic of Ireland, and catches fire, killing six of 12 people on board.
 February 14 – Central American Airways Flight 731, a Let L-410 Turbolet, crashes while on approach to Toncontín International Airport, killing all 14 on board.
 March 21 – The 2011 Trans Air Congo Antonov An-12 crash: an Antonov An-12 crashes on approach to Pointe Noire Airport, Republic of the Congo, killing all four crew on board and another 19 on the ground.
 April 1 – Southwest Airlines Flight 812, a Boeing 737, ruptures a hole in the fuselage at 36,000 feet, causing the cabin to lose pressure shortly after takeoff from Phoenix Sky Harbor International Airport. The plane lands safely at Yuma International Airport, Arizona, with 116 people aboard, two passengers with minor injuries.
 April 4 – Georgian Airways Flight 834, a Bombardier CRJ-100 operated by the United Nations Mission in the Democratic Republic of Congo (MONUSCO) crashes on landing at N'djili Airport, Democratic Republic of the Congo; all but one of the 33 on board are killed.
 May 7 – Merpati Nusantara Airlines Flight 8968, a Xian MA60, crashes off the coast of West Papua, Indonesia, while on approach to Kaimana Airport in heavy rain, killing all 25 passengers and crew on board.
 May 18 – Sol Líneas Aéreas Flight 5428, a Saab 340, crashes off Prahuaniyeu, Río Negro, Argentina, while en route to General Enrique Mosconi International Airport, Comodoro Rivadavia due to ice formation on the wings, propellers and under the fuselage, killing all 22 passengers and crew on board.
 June 20 – RusAir Flight 9605, a Tupolev Tu-134, crashes onto the Russian highway A133 near the village of Besovets, Petrozavodsk, Russia, while on approach to Petrozavodsk Airport, killing 47 of 52 on board.
 July 4 – In the Missinippi Airways Cessna 208 crash, a Cessna 208 Caravan overruns the runway and crashes into a ravine at Pukatawagan Airport, Manitoba after a failed aborted takeoff. One passenger is killed.
 July 6 – The 2011 Silk Way Airlines Ilyushin Il-76 crash: An Ilyushin Il-76 crashes into a mountain  short of Bagram Air Base in Afghanistan, killing all nine people on board the cargo flight from Baku, operated on behalf of NATO.
 July 8 – Hewa Bora Airways Flight 952, a Boeing 727, crashes on landing at Bangoka International Airport, Democratic Republic of the Congo, killing 74 of 118 on board.
 July 11 – Angara Airlines Flight 9007, an Antonov An-24, ditches in the Ob River, Russia, after an engine fire, killing seven of 37 on board.
 July 13 – Noar Linhas Aéreas Flight 4896, a Let L-410 Turbolet, crashes shortly after takeoff from Recife Airport, Brazil, killing all 16 on board.
 July 29 – EgyptAir Flight 667, a Boeing 777, suffers a cockpit fire at Cairo International Airport, injuring seven of 317 on board.
 July 30 – Caribbean Airlines Flight 523, a Boeing 737, overruns the runway on landing at Cheddi Jagan International Airport, Georgetown, Guyana, and breaks in two; seven are injured but all 163 passengers and crew survive.
 August 9 – Avis-Amur Flight 9209, an Antonov An-12, en route from Magadan Airport to Keperveyem Airport, crashes at Omsukchan, Russia, due to an engine fire, killing all 11 on board.
 August 20 – First Air Flight 6560, a Boeing 737, crashes while on approach to Resolute Bay Airport, Nunavut, Canada, killing 12 of 15 on board.
 September 6 – Aerocon Flight 238, a Fairchild Metroliner III, crashes near Trinidad, Bolivia, killing eight of nine people on board.
 September 7 – 2011 Lokomotiv Yaroslavl plane crash, a Yak-Service Yakovlev Yak-42, crashes just after takeoff from Tunoshna Airport, Yaroslavl, Russia, due to pilot error, killing 44 of the 45 people on board. Many were players and staff of the Lokomotiv Yaroslavl ice hockey team of the KHL, as the flight was destined for Minsk, Belarus for a league game.
 September 25 – Buddha Air Flight 103, a Beechcraft 1900D, crashes in dense fog while attempting to land at Kathmandu Tribhuwan International Airport, killing all 16 passengers and three crew members.
 September 29 – Nusantara Buana Air Flight 823, a CASA C-212 Aviocar crashes in Indonesia during a domestic flight from Medan to Kutacane. All 18 passengers and crew are killed.
 October 13 – Airlines PNG Flight 1600, a de Havilland Canada DHC-8, crashes near the mouth of the Gogol River, Papua New Guinea, killing 28 of 32 on board.
 October 14 – In the Moremi Air Cessna 208 crash, a Cessna 208 Grand Caravan crashes shortly after taking off from Xakanaka Airstrip, Botswana. The pilot and seven passengers are killed, with four passengers surviving the crash.
 October 18 – Iran Air Flight 742, a Boeing 727, en route from Moscow, Russia, to Tehran, Iran, lands without nose gear at Mehrabad International Airport; all 94 passengers and 14 crew members survive without injuries.
 November 1 – LOT Polish Airlines Flight 16, a Boeing 767, performs a belly landing at Warsaw Chopin Airport after its landing gear failed to deploy; all 220 passengers and 11 crew members survive without injuries.

2012 

 April 2 – UTair Flight 120, an ATR-72, crashes shortly after takeoff from Roshchino International Airport, Tyumen, Russia, killing 31 of the 43 passengers and crew on board.
 April 20 – Bhoja Air Flight 213, a Boeing 737, crashes near Chaklala airbase, Rawalpindi, Pakistan, in bad weather, killing all 127 people on board.
 May 9 – In the Mount Salak Sukhoi Superjet 100 crash, a Sukhoi Superjet 100 crashes into Mount Salak, Indonesia, on an exhibition flight, killing all 45 passengers and crew on board.
 May 14 – In the 2012 Agni Air Dornier 228 crash, a Dornier Do-228 crashes near Jomsom Airport, Nepal, during a go-around; of the 21 on board, six survive.
 June 2 – Allied Air Flight 111, a Boeing 727, overruns the runway on landing at Kotoka International Airport, Accra, Ghana, and crashes through a fence; the aircraft then hits a bus on a nearby road; all four crew survive but 12 are killed on the ground.
 June 3 – Dana Air Flight 992, a McDonnell Douglas MD-83 carrying 147 passengers and six crew members crashes in a suburb of Lagos, Nigeria, on approach to Murtala Muhammed International Airport, killing all on board and 10 more people on the ground.
 June 29 – Six people attempt to hijack Tianjin Airlines Flight 7554, an Embraer E-190, 10 minutes after takeoff; passengers and crew are able to restrain the hijackers until the aircraft makes an emergency landing; of the 101 on board, two hijackers die and 11 passengers and crew are injured; this is China's first serious hijacking attempt since 1990.
 August 19 – An Alfa Airlines Antonov An-24-100 crashes in the Nuba mountain range near Talodi, Sudan, on approach to Talodi Airstrip, killing all 32 people on board.
 September 12 – Petropavlovsk-Kamchatsky Air Flight 251, an Antonov An-28, crashes in Kamchatka Peninsula, Russia, killing 10 of the 14 passengers and crew on board.
 September 28 – Sita Air Flight 601, a Dornier Do 228, crashes on the bank of the Manohara River, Kathmandu, Nepal, after a bird strike, killing all 19 on board.
 November 30 – In the 2012 Aéro-Service Ilyushin Il-76T crash, an Ilyushin Il-76T freighter crashes short of runway threshold on approach to Maya–Maya Airport, Brazzaville, Republic of Congo, in bad weather, killing all six aboard, 26 on the ground, and injuring 14.
 December 17 – The 2012 Amazon Sky An-26 crash kills a crew of four, when the aircraft hits the ground while crossing the Andes.
 December 25 – Air Bagan Flight 011, a Fokker 100, crash-lands on a road near Heho Airport, Myanmar, killing one on board, one on the ground and injuring 11.
 December 29 – Red Wings Airlines Flight 9268, a Tupolev Tu-204 on a re-positioning flight, overruns the runway on landing at Moscow's Vnukovo International Airport, then breaks apart and catches fire; five of the eight crew on board are killed in the first fatal accident involving the Tu-204.

2013 
 January 29 – SCAT Airlines Flight 760, a Bombardier CRJ200, crashes in thick fog on approach to Almaty International Airport, Kazakhstan, killing all 16 passengers and five crew on board.
 February 13 – South Airlines Flight 8971, an Antonov An-24, crash-lands in dense fog at Donetsk International Airport, Ukraine, killing five of 52 people on board.
 March 4 – A CAA Fokker 50 crashes in poor weather conditions on approach to Goma International Airport, Democratic Republic of the Congo, killing all five crew and one of the four passengers.
 March 8 – ACE Air Cargo Flight 51, a Beechcraft 1900C-1 crashes into a mountain whilst on approach into Dillingham Municipal Airport, Alaska. Both crew members were killed.
 April 13 – Lion Air Flight 904, a Boeing 737 carrying 101 passengers and seven crew members, crashes into the ocean while attempting to land at Ngurah Rai International Airport on the Indonesian island of Bali, injuring 46 people.
 April 29 – National Airlines Flight 102, a Boeing 747 freighter, stalls and crashes shortly after takeoff from Bagram Airfield, Afghanistan, due to load shifting, killing all seven crew members on board.
 May 16 – Nepal Airlines Flight 555, a de Havilland Canada DHC-6, overruns the runway on landing at Jomsom Airport, Nepal, injuring seven people.

 June 10 – Merpati Nusantara Airlines Flight 6517, a Xian MA60, crashes on landing at El Tari Airport, Indonesia, injuring five people.

 July 6 – Asiana Airlines Flight 214, a Boeing 777, crashes short of the runway on landing at San Francisco International Airport, killing three of 307 on board and injuring 182. The crash was the first fatal accident involving the Boeing 777.
 July 7 – A de Havilland Canada DHC-3 operated by Rediske Air crashes on approach to Soldotna Airport, Alaska, killing all 10 people on board.

 July 22 – Southwest Airlines Flight 345, a Boeing 737, suffers a landing gear collapse while landing at LaGuardia Airport, injuring 9.
 August 14 – UPS Airlines Flight 1354, an Airbus A300 freighter, crashes short of the runway on approach to Birmingham–Shuttlesworth International Airport, killing the two pilots on board.
 October 3 – Associated Aviation Flight 361, an Embraer 120, crashes shortly after takeoff from Murtala Muhammed International Airport, Lagos, killing 16 people on board.
 October 16 – Lao Airlines Flight 301, an ATR-72, crashes shortly before landing at Pakse International Airport under adverse weather conditions, killing all 44 passengers and five crew on board.
 November 17 – Tatarstan Airlines Flight 363, a Boeing 737, crashes at Kazan International Airport, Russia, during a go-around, killing all 50 people on board.
 November 29 – LAM Mozambique Airlines Flight 470, an Embraer 190, en route from Maputo International Airport, Mozambique, to Quatro de Fevereiro Airport, Angola is deliberately crashed by the captain into Bwabwata National Park in northern Namibia, killing all 33 people on board.

2014 

 February 16 – Nepal Airlines Flight 183, a de Havilland Canada DHC-6, crashes near Khidim about 74 kilometres southwest of Pokhara, Nepal, killing all 18 people on board.
 February 17 – Ethiopian Airlines Flight 702, a Boeing 767, is hijacked by the co-pilot while en route from Addis Ababa, Ethiopia, to Rome, Italy, but lands safely at Geneva, Switzerland. All 202 passengers and crew aboard are unharmed.
 March 8 – Malaysia Airlines Flight 370, a Boeing 777 en route from Kuala Lumpur to Beijing with 227 passengers and 12 crew on board, disappears from radar over the Gulf of Thailand. A wing part was later found in Réunion.
 July 17 – Malaysia Airlines Flight 17, a Boeing 777 en route from Amsterdam to Kuala Lumpur, is shot down over eastern Ukraine, killing all 283 passengers and 15 crew on board in the deadliest civilian airliner shootdown incident.
 July 23 – TransAsia Airways Flight 222, an ATR-72 en route from Kaohsiung to Penghu, Taiwan, crashes during go-around, killing 48 of the 58 people on board.
 July 24 – Air Algérie Flight 5017, a chartered Swiftair McDonnell Douglas MD-83 operating for Air Algérie en route from Burkina Faso to Algiers, crashes in the northern Mali desert after disappearing from radar approximately 50 minutes after takeoff, killing all 110 passengers and six crew members on board.
 August 10 – Sepahan Airlines Flight 5915, a HESA IrAn-140 (an Antonov An-140 built under license) crashes shortly after takeoff from Mehrabad International Airport, Iran, killing 39 of the 48 people on board.
 December 14 – Loganair Flight 6780, a Saab 2000, nosedives after a lightning strike. The crew makes a safe emergency landing back at Aberdeen. All 33 passengers and crew are unharmed.
 December 28 – Indonesia AirAsia Flight 8501, an Airbus A320 en route from Surabaya, Indonesia to Singapore, crashes into waters off Borneo, killing all 155 passengers and seven crew on board.

2015 

 February 4 – TransAsia Airways Flight 235, an ATR-72, stalls on takeoff and crashes into the Keelung River in Taiwan after striking the Huandong Viaduct and a passing taxi. 43 of the 58 passengers and crew on board are killed.
 March 5 – Delta Air Lines Flight 1086, a McDonnell Douglas MD-88 skids off the runway at LaGuardia Airport and crashes into a fence, coming inches from Flushing Bay. Several people are injured, but there are no fatalities.
 March 24 – Germanwings Flight 9525, an Airbus A320, crashes in southern France en route from Barcelona, Spain to Düsseldorf, Germany as a result of a deliberate act by the first officer. All 144 passengers and six crew on board the aircraft die in the crash.
 March 29 – Air Canada Flight 624, an Airbus A320, crashes short of the runway and hits power lines while landing at Stanfield International Airport, en route from Toronto. All 138 passengers and crew on board survive, with 23 treated for minor injuries.
 April 13 – Carson Air Flight 66, a Swearingen Metro II crashes into a mountain en route to Prince George Airport, British Columbia. Both crew members are killed.
 April 14 – Asiana Airlines Flight 162, an Airbus A320, crashes short of the runway and hits a localizer while landing at Hiroshima Airport, en route from Seoul. All 82 passengers and crew on board survive, but 27 are injured.
 April 25 – Turkish Airlines Flight 1878, an Airbus A320, is severely damaged in a landing accident at Atatürk International Airport. All 102 passengers and crew on board are evacuated without injury.
 August 16 – Trigana Air Service Flight 267, an ATR-42, crashes while en route from Sentani Airport, to Oskibil Airport in the eastern Indonesian province of Papua. All 49 passengers and five crew members are killed in the crash in the worst aviation accident ever involving the ATR-42.
 September 5 – In the 2015 Senegal mid-air collision, a Boeing 737-800, collides in a mid-air with a BAe 125 air ambulance operated by Senegalair over eastern Senegal. The BAe 125 crashes in the Atlantic killing all seven on board, while the 737 lands safely without any injuries to those on board.
 September 8 – British Airways Flight 2276, a Boeing 777-200, aborts takeoff at McCarran International Airport, Las Vegas, NV following an engine fire. All 189 passengers and crew are evacuated safely.
 October 2 – Aviastar Flight 7503, a DHC-6 Twin Otter, crashes on a mountain 11 minutes after take-off over Palopo, Indonesia, killing all 10 passengers and crew on board.
 October 29 – Dynamic Airways Flight 405, a Boeing 767-200, erupts in flames while preparing for take-off at Fort Lauderdale-Hollywood International Airport. All 101 passengers and crew on board survive, but 21 people are injured.
 October 31 – Metrojet Flight 9268, an Airbus A321, explodes in mid-air over the Sinai Peninsula due to a terrorist bomb, 23 minutes after takeoff from Sharm-El-Sheikh, killing all 224 passengers and crew on board.
 November 4 – In the 2015 Juba An-12 crash, an Allied Services, Ltd. Antonov An-12 crashes near the White Nile shortly after takeoff from Juba International Airport, killing 37 of 39 on board.
 November 22 – Avia Traffic Company Flight 768, a Boeing 737-300, touches down hard at Osh Airport injuring 8, and causing all landing gears to be ripped off. The aircraft skids off the runway and the left engine is ripped off.
 December 24 – In the 2015 Services Air Airbus A310-300 crash, an Airbus A310-300F overshoots the runway at Mbuji-Mayi Airport, Democratic Republic of the Congo due to a brake failure. The five crew survive but eight on the ground are killed.

2016 

 January 8 – West Air Sweden Flight 294, a Bombardier CRJ200 cargo freighter, crashes while in cruise near Akkajaure in Sweden; both crew members on board are killed.
 February 2 – Daallo Airlines Flight 159, an Airbus A321, suffers an explosion shortly after taking off from Aden Adde International Airport, Somalia; two people are injured and one, the suspected suicide bomber, is killed after falling from the aircraft.
 February 24 – Tara Air Flight 193, a Viking Air-built DHC-6 Twin Otter, flies into a storm and crashes into a mountainside at Dana, Myagdi district, Nepal, killing all 23 on board.
 February 26 – In the 2016 Air Kasthamandap crash, an Air Kasthamandap PAC 750XL crash-lands in Nepal, killing the two crew members and injuring nine passengers.
 March 9 – True Aviation Flight 21, an Antonov An-26 crashes into the sea whilst trying to return to Cox's Bazar Airport, Bangladesh after an engine failure, killing three of the four crew on board.
 March 19 – Flydubai Flight 981, a Boeing 737-800, crashes while landing at Rostov-on-Don, Russia, in poor weather, killing all 62 people on board.
 March 29 – EgyptAir Flight 181, an Airbus A320, is hijacked and forcibly diverted to Larnaca International Airport, Cyprus; all passengers and crew are released unharmed.
 April 4 – Batik Air Flight 7703, a Boeing 737-800, collides with an ATR 42 on the runway at Halim Perdanakusma Airport in Jakarta; both aircraft are substantially damaged, but all 60 occupants of the two aircraft survive.
 April 13 – A Sunbird Aviation Britten-Norman Islander crashes on approach to Kiunga Airport in the Western Province of Papua New Guinea, while operating a non-scheduled domestic charter flight, killing all 12 on board.
 April 29 – In the 2016 Turøy helicopter crash, a Eurocopter EC225L Super Puma helicopter crashes near Turøy, an island off the coast of Norway; all 13 passengers and crew are killed.
 May 18 – In the 2016 Silk Way Airlines Antonov An-12 crash,  a Silk Way Airlines Antonov An-12 cargo plane crashes after an engine failure, killing seven and injuring two.
 May 19 – EgyptAir Flight 804, an Airbus A320, crashes into the eastern Mediterranean Sea after a series of sharp descending turns; all 56 passengers and 10 crew are killed.
 May 27 – Korean Air Flight 2708, a Boeing 777-300, suffers an engine failure and resulting fire while taxiing for takeoff at Haneda Airport; all 319 passengers and crew are evacuated although 12 are injured.
 August 3 – Emirates Flight 521, a Boeing 777-300, lands wheels-up at Dubai International Airport and bursts into flames shortly after landing; all 300 passengers and crew escape from the aircraft unharmed, but one firefighter is killed by an explosion.
 August 5 – ASL Airlines Hungary Flight 7332, a Boeing 737, overruns a runway on landing at Orio al Serio International Airport; both pilots survive.
 August 27 – Southwest Airlines Flight 3472, a Boeing 737, suffers an uncontained engine failure over the Gulf of Mexico, causing substantial damage to the aircraft and loss of cabin pressure; the aircraft lands safely at Pensacola International Airport, with no injuries among the 104 on board.
 October 28 – American Airlines Flight 383, a Boeing 767-300ER, suffers an uncontained engine failure and fire at Chicago O'Hare Airport; 20 of the 170 people on board suffer injuries.
 October 28 – FedEx Express Flight 910, a McDonnell Douglas MD-10-10F, skids off the runway after the landing gear collapses on landing at Fort Lauderdale-Hollywood International Airport; the left wing is severely damaged in a post-crash fire but both pilots survive.
 October 31 – In the 2016 Alfa Indonesia DHC-4 crash, a DHC-4T Turbo Caribou operating a cargo flight to Ilaga Airport, Indonesia, crashes in the Ilaga Pass; all four crew members are killed.
 November 28 – LaMia Flight 2933, an Avro RJ85, crashes at Cerro Gordo en route to Medellín, Colombia, whilst carrying the Brazilian football team Chapecoense; all but six of the 77 passengers and crew die.
 December 7 – Pakistan International Airlines Flight 661, an ATR-42-500, crashes at Havelian while en route from Chitral to Islamabad; all 42 passengers and five crew members are killed in the accident.
 December 20 – Aerosucre Flight 157, a Boeing 727-200, crashes while failing to take off from Puerto Carreño en route to Bogota, Colombia; there is only one survivor among the six crew members on board.
 December 23 – Afriqiyah Airways Flight 209, an Airbus A320-214, is hijacked by two Gaddafi supporters and forced to land at Malta Airport; after several hours, all passengers and crew are released and the hijackers surrender.

2017 

 January 16 – Turkish Airlines Flight 6491, a Boeing 747-400F, crashes into a residential area upon attempting landing in thick fog in Bishkek, Kyrgyzstan. The four crew members and 35 people on the ground are killed.
 March 8 – Ameristar Charters Flight 9363, an MD-83 chartered to fly the Michigan Wolverines men's basketball team to the 2017 Big Ten Men's Basketball Tournament in Washington, D.C., overruns the runway on takeoff at Willow Run Airport, Ypsilanti, Michigan after suffering a jammed elevator. The aircraft is damaged but all 116 on board survive.
 March 20 – In the 2017 South Supreme Airlines Antonov An-26 crash, an Antonov An-26 crashes on landing at Wau Airport, South Sudan. All 40 passengers and five crew members survive.
 March 28 – Peruvian Airlines Flight 112, a Boeing 737-300, is burnt out following the collapse of the landing gear at Francisco Carle Airport, Jauja. All 150 people on board survive.

 April 29 – In the 2017 Aerogaviota Antonov An-26 crash, an Antonov An-26 crashes into a mountain whilst on a military charter flight from Gustavo Rizo Airport, Cuba. All eight on board are killed.
 May 27 – Summit Air Flight 409, a Let L-410 operating a cargo flight crashes short of Lukla Airport, Nepal in poor visibility. Two of the three crew members are killed, one of whom dies later in hospital.
 July 7 – Air Canada Flight 759, an Airbus A320 on approach to runway 28R at San Francisco International Airport, nearly lands on a taxiway occupied by four loaded passenger jets. No one is killed or injured.
 September 30 – Air France Flight 66, an Airbus A380, suffers an uncontained engine failure and makes an emergency landing at Goose Bay Airport, Newfoundland & Labrador, Canada. No one is killed or injured.
 October 14 – In the 2017 Valan International Antonov An-26 crash, an Antonov An-26 crashes into the sea just short of Abidjan's Félix Houphouët Boigny International Airport, Ivory Coast. Four of the ten occupants are killed.
 November 15 – Khabarovsk Airlines Flight 463, a Let L-410 Turbolet, crashes short of the runway at Nelkan Airport in Russia, killing four of the five passengers and both crew members.
 December 13 – West Wind Aviation Flight 282, an ATR 42-300, crashes shortly after takeoff from Fond-du-Lac Airport, Saskatchewan, Canada. Of the 25 passengers and crew on board, all initially survive, but one passenger dies of his injuries in the hospital 12 days later.
 December 31 – Nature Air Flight 9916, a Cessna 208 Caravan crashes shortly after takeoff from Punta Islita Airport, Costa Rica. All 12 passengers and crew on board are killed.

2018 
 January 13 – Pegasus Airlines Flight 8622, a Boeing 737-800, skids off the end of the runway at Trabzon Airport, Turkey and comes to rest on a cliff. All 168 passengers and crew survive without injury. The aircraft is written off.
 February 11 – Saratov Airlines Flight 703, an Antonov An-148, crashes shortly after taking off from Domodedovo International Airport, Russia. All 71 passengers and crew are killed.
 February 13 – United Airlines Flight 1175 , a Boeing 777-200 operating a domestic flight between San Francisco International Airport and Honolulu International Airport, suffers an uncontained engine failure over the Pacific Ocean. An emergency landing is successfully performed at Honolulu and all 373 passengers and crew survive unharmed.
 February 18 – Iran Aseman Airlines Flight 3704, an ATR 72–200 on a domestic flight in Iran, crashes into the Zagros Mountains killing all 60 passengers and six crew members on board.
 March 11 – A Bombardier Challenger 604 private jet crashes in the Zagros Mountains, Iran, killing all 11 people on board.
 March 12 – US-Bangla Airlines Flight 211, a Bombardier Q400 on an international flight from Dhaka to Nepal, crashes at Tribhuvan International Airport; 51 of the 71 people on board are killed.

 April 17 – Southwest Airlines Flight 1380, a Boeing 737-700 en route over Bernville, Pennsylvania, suffers an engine failure at cruise altitude. Some debris enters the fuselage, causing substantial damage to the aircraft and loss of cabin pressure. The crew safely diverts to Philadelphia International Airport. One passenger is killed; another seven are injured.
 April 18 – Delta Air Lines Flight 30, an Airbus A330-300, experiences an engine fire after takeoff from Atlanta, Georgia. The aircraft immediately returns to Atlanta and makes an emergency landing. All 288 people on board survive without any injuries. The aircraft receives substantial damage.
 May 14 – Sichuan Airlines Flight 8633, an Airbus A319-100, makes an emergency landing at China's Chengdu Shuangliu Airport after part of the cockpit windshield fails; all 128 passengers and crew survive the incident.
 May 18 – Cubana de Aviación Flight 972, a Boeing 737-200/Adv, crashes shortly after takeoff from José Martí International Airport in Havana, Cuba. 112 of the 113 passengers and crew are killed; the sole survivor is seriously injured.
 June 28 – A Beechcraft King Air C90 crashes at Jagruti Nagar, India, killing all four people on the aircraft and one person on the ground.
 July 28 – Air Vanuatu Flight 241, an ATR 72-500, skids off the runway after a flight from Tanna to Port Villa, Vanuatu. 13 of the 43 people on board suffer minor injuries.
 July 31 – Aeroméxico Connect Flight 2431, an Embraer ERJ-190AR, crashes into wooded terrain in Durango shortly after take-off from Durango International Airport. The aircraft is destroyed, but all 99 passengers and four crew survive.
 August 4 – A Ju-Air Junkers Ju 52 crashes near Piz Segnas, Switzerland, killing all 20 on board.
 August 10 – 2018 Horizon Air Q400 incident, a Horizon Air Bombardier Dash 8 Q400 aircraft registered N449QX, is stolen from Seattle–Tacoma International Airport with no passengers on board and later crashes on Ketron Island, killing the sole occupant.
 August 16 – Xiamen Airlines Flight 8667, a Boeing 737-800,  crash-lands at Ninoy Aquino International Airport amidst heavy monsoon rains while landing runway 06/24. The aircraft skids off the end of the runway. All 157 passengers and eight crew are unharmed.
 September 1 – UTair Flight 579, a Boeing 737-800, overshoots the runway and catches fire while landing in Sochi International Airport, injuring 18 people. One airport employee dies of a heart attack.

 September 9 – A Let L-410 Turbolet crashes into a lake in Yirol, South Sudan, killing 20 of the 23 passengers and crew on board.
 September 28 – Air Niugini Flight 73, a Boeing 737-800, lands short of the runway and comes to rest in a lagoon at Chuuk International Airport in the Federated States of Micronesia, one passenger dies whilst 34 passengers and 12 crew escape without serious injuries.
 October 11 – Air India Express Flight 611, a Boeing 737-800 operating an international flight from Tiruchirappalli, India to Dubai, United Arab Emirates, suffers a tail strike and crashes into Airport equipment and a perimeter wall on takeoff. The aircraft continues to fly for hours before diverting to Mumbai. All 136 people on board survive.
 October 29 – Lion Air Flight 610, a Boeing 737 MAX 8 bound for Pangkal Pinang, Indonesia, crashes into the Java Sea shortly after takeoff from Soekarno–Hatta International Airport in Jakarta due to a design flaw in the Maneuvering Characteristics Augmentation System (MCAS), an automatic flight stabilization program. All 181 passengers and eight crew are killed.
 November 7 – Sky Lease Cargo Flight 4854, a Boeing 747-400F, overran the runway while attempting a landing at Halifax Stanfield International Airport. Three crew members were injured.
 November 9 – Fly Jamaica Airways Flight 256, a Boeing 757-200, crash lands after returning to Cheddi Jagan International Airport, Guyana, after suffering a hydraulic failure 45 minutes after takeoff en route to Toronto. All on board initially survive, but one passenger dies a week later due to injuries sustained in the crash.
 November 11 – Air Astana Flight 1388, an Embraer ERJ-190, suffers severe control issues shortly after takeoff. It lands safely 90 minutes later at Beja Airbase. The aircraft is written off.
 November 29 – VietJet Air Flight 356, an Airbus A321-271N, touches down hard at Buon Ma Thuot Airport, causing substantial damage to its nosegear and breaking off both wheels. Among 207 passengers and crew on board, six are hospitalized.

2019 

 January 14 – A Saha Airlines Boeing 707 crashes after overshooting the runway at Fath Air Base in Iran, when the crew attempts to land at the wrong airport; 15 of the 16 people on board lose their lives.
 February 23 – Atlas Air Flight 3591, a Boeing 767 en route from Miami, Florida, to Houston, Texas, United States, crashes into Trinity Bay on approach to Houston's George Bush Intercontinental Airport, killing both crew members and the single passenger on board.
 February 24 – Biman Bangladesh Airlines Flight 147, a Boeing 737-800 flying from Bangladesh to Dubai, undergoes an attempted hijacking and makes an emergency landing at Shah Amanat International Airport in Chittagong; all passengers are safely evacuated and the perpetrator is shot dead by Bangladeshi special forces.
 March 4 – United Express Flight 4933, an Embraer EMB145XR attempting to land at Presque Isle International Airport in Maine, departs the runway after the pilots fail to realize that the aircraft is not aligned with the runway surface, which is partially obscured by snow; three aircraft occupants suffer minor injuries.
 March 9 – A Laser Aéreo Douglas DC-3 crashes while attempting to land at La Vanguardia Airport, Villavicencio, Colombia, killing all 11 passengers and three crew members on board the aircraft.
 March 10 – Ethiopian Airlines Flight 302, a Boeing 737 MAX 8 bound for Nairobi, Kenya, crashes near Bishoftu, Ethiopia, shortly after taking off from Addis Ababa's Bole International Airport, due to an MCAS malfunction similar to the one that downed Lion Air Flight 610 in 2018; all 157 people on board die.
 May 3 – Miami Air International Flight 293, a Boeing 737-81Q operating a flight from Guantánamo Bay, Cuba, to Florida, United States, overshoots the runway on landing at Naval Air Station Jacksonville during a thunderstorm; all 143 passengers and crew survived the accident.
 May 5 – Aeroflot Flight 1492, a Sukhoi Superjet 100 operating a domestic flight in Russia, suffers an inflight electrical failure shortly after departing from Sheremetyevo International Airport, Moscow, and returns to the airport where it catches fire after landing; 41 of the 78 people on board died.
 May 8 – Biman Bangladesh Airlines Flight 060, a Bombardier Q400 inbound from Shahjalal International Airport in Bangladesh, overshoots the runway in bad weather at Yangon International Airport, Myanmar; all 33 people on board survived but 18 were injured.
 May 13 – A Taquan Air de Havilland Canada DHC-3 Turbine Otter floatplane collides in mid-air with a Mountain Air Service de Havilland Canada DHC-2 Beaver floatplane, while both are operating sightseeing flights over George Inlet, Alaska, United States; the DHC-2 pilot and all four passengers are killed; the DHC-3 makes an emergency water landing with the loss of one of its 10 passengers.
 June 27 – Angara Airlines Flight 200, an Antonov An-24 operating a domestic flight in Russia, suffers an in-flight engine failure and lands at Nizhneangarsk Airport where it overshoots the runway and crashes into a building; all 43 passengers survive but two of the four crew members are killed.
 August 15 – Ural Airlines Flight 178, an Airbus A321 bound for Simferopol, Crimea, suffers a double bird strike immediately after takeoff from Zhukovsky International Airport in Moscow, Russia, and performs an emergency belly landing in a cornfield; 74 of the 233 people on board are injured.
 October 4 – Ukraine Air Alliance Flight 4050, an Antonov An-12 en route from Spain to Turkey, crashes on approach to its intermediate stopover at Lviv International Airport in Ukraine, due to fuel exhaustion; five of the eight occupants are killed and the three survivors are seriously injured.
 October 17 – PenAir Flight 3296, a Saab 2000 flying from Anchorage, Alaska, United States, to Amaknak Island off the Alaskan coast, overshoots the runway after landing in erratic wind conditions, critically injuring two of the 42 people on board, one of whom dies the next day.
 November 24 – A Busy Bee Dornier Do 228 crashes into a densely populated area shortly after takeoff from Goma International Airport in the Democratic Republic of the Congo, killing all 19 occupants of the aircraft and 10 people on the ground.
 December 27 – Bek Air Flight 2100, a Fokker 100 operating a domestic flight in Kazakhstan, crashes on takeoff from Almaty International Airport, killing 13 of the 98 people on board and injuring 66.

2020s

2020 
 January 8 – Ukraine International Airlines Flight 752, a Boeing 737-800 bound for Kyiv, Ukraine, crashes shortly after taking off from Imam Khomeini International Airport in Tehran, Iran, after being hit by two surface-to-air missiles launched by Iranian military forces; all 176 crew and passengers on board are killed.
 January 14 – Delta Air Lines Flight 89, a Boeing 777-200, dumps fuel over several schools and neighborhoods while returning to Los Angeles International Airport due to a compressor stall, injuring 56.

 January 27 – Caspian Airlines Flight 6936, a McDonnell Douglas MD-83, flying a domestic flight from Tehran, Iran, overruns the runway on landing at Mahshahr Airport, Iran; the aircraft comes to a stop on a road, injuring 2 of the 144 passengers and crew on board.
 February 5 – Pegasus Airlines Flight 2193, a Boeing 737-800 operating a domestic flight between İzmir and Istanbul in Turkey, skids off the runway and drops down an embankment on landing at Sabiha Gökçen International Airport; three of the 183 people on board are killed.
 May 4 – An East African Express Airways Embraer EMB 120 Brasilia crashes after being fired upon by Ethiopian ground forces during a charter cargo flight carrying pandemic relief supplies to Berdale, Somalia; all four passengers and two crew are killed.
 May 22 – Pakistan International Airlines Flight 8303, an Airbus A320, crashes in a residential neighborhood in Karachi minutes before a second attempted landing at Jinnah International Airport. 2 passengers survive among the 99 on board. One victim on the ground later dies from her injuries.
 August 7 – Air India Express Flight 1344, a Boeing 737-800 operating an international repatriation flight, crashes on landing at Kozhikode International Airport, skidding off the runway and plunging into a gorge; 21 occupants are killed, including both pilots.
 August 22 – A South West Aviation Antonov An-26 crashes in a residential area after taking off for a charter cargo flight from Juba International Airport, South Sudan, killing 8 of 9 people on board.
 November 13 – Volga-Dnepr Airlines Flight 4066, an An-124 operating a cargo flight from Novosibirsk, Russia to Vienna, Austria, suffers an uncontained engine failure on takeoff and overruns the runway upon returning to Novosibirsk. All 14 crew members survive the incident.

2021 
 January 9 – Sriwijaya Air Flight 182, a Boeing 737-500 operating a domestic flight to Pontianak, Indonesia, crashes shortly after takeoff from Jakarta's Soekarno–Hatta International Airport. All 62 passengers and crew are killed in the crash.
 February 20 – Longtail Aviation Flight 5504, a Boeing 747-400BCF operating a cargo flight from Maastricht, Netherlands to New York, United States suffers engine failure shortly after takeoff. The aircraft safely diverts to Liege, Belgium but two people on the ground are injured by falling debris.
 February 20 – United Airlines Flight 328, a Boeing 777-200 flying from Denver to Honolulu suffers an uncontained engine failure after takeoff, scattering debris over residential neighborhoods below. The plane uses the remaining engine to safely land in Denver, none of the 241 passengers and crew are injured, nor was anyone injured on the ground from debris.
 March 2 – A South Sudan Supreme Airlines Let L-410 Turbolet crashes whilst operating a domestic flight from Pieri to Yuai, South Sudan. All 8 passengers and 2 crew are killed.
 May 12 – Key Lime Air Flight 970, a Swearingen Metroliner on a chartered cargo flight from Salida, Colorado, collides with a Cirrus SR22 on approach to Centennial Airport, Colorado. The Cirrus crash-lands in a nearby field whilst the Swearingen Metroliner makes an emergency landing. All three occupants on both aircraft survive.
 May 23  – Ryanair Flight 4978, a Boeing 737-800 operating an international scheduled passenger flight from Athens, Greece to Vilnius, Lithuania, is forced to land at Minsk, Belarus after a false bomb alarm, escorted by a Belarusian Air Force MiG-29. Activist Roman Protasevich, who was on board the aircraft, is arrested.

 July 2 – Transair Flight 810, a Boeing 737-200C operating a domestic cargo flight in Hawaii between Honolulu, Oahu and the neighbouring island of Maui, suffers engine failure shortly after takeoff and ditches in the sea. Both pilots survive with injuries.
 July 6 – Petropavlovsk-Kamchatsky Air Enterprise Flight 251, an Antonov An-26 operating a domestic flight from Petropavlovsk-Kamchatsky to Palana, Russia, crashes on approach. All 22 passengers and 6 crew are killed.
 July 16 – Siberian Light Aviation Flight 42, an Antonov An-28 operating a domestic flight from Kedrovy to Tomsk, Russia, makes a crash landing after takeoff, injuring 11 of the 18 passengers and crew on board.
 September 12 – Siberian Light Aviation Flight 51, a Let L-410 operating a domestic flight from Irkutsk to Kazachinskoye, Russia, crashes in a forest short of the runway while attempting to land in heavy fog. 4 of the 16 occupants are killed and the 12 survivors are seriously injured.

 October 19 – In the 2021 Houston MD-87 crash, a McDonnell Douglas MD-87 aircraft crashes on take-off from Houston Executive Airport, Houston, Texas. All 21 people on board survive.
 November 3 – Grodno Aviakompania Flight 1252, an Antonov An-12, crashes whilst attempting to land at Irkutsk International Airport, Russia whilst operating a cargo flight. All 9 aboard are killed.

2022 
 February 26 – AB Aviation Flight 1103, a Cessna 208D Grand Caravan operating a flight from Moroni to Mohéli, crashes into the ocean while en route. All 14 occupants aboard are killed.

 March 21 – China Eastern Airlines Flight 5735, a Boeing 737-89P operating a domestic flight from Kunming to Guangzhou, China, crashes in a mountainous region in Guangxi after entering a near vertical nosedive, killing all 132 on board.
 April 7 – DHL Aero Expreso Flight 7216, a Boeing 757-27A PCF suffered hydraulic issues and overran the runway during an emergency landing, breaking in two. There were no serious injuries.
 May 12 – Tibet Airlines Flight 9833, an Airbus A319-100, aborts a take-off from Chongqing and veers off the runway. A fire erupts, but all 122 occupants evacuate safely.
 May 29 – Tara Air Flight 197, a de Havilland Canada DHC-6 Twin Otter operating a flight from Pokhara to Jomsom, Nepal, crashes in poor weather conditions, killing all 22 on board.
 June 21 – RED Air Flight 203, a McDonnell Douglas MD-82 operating a flight from Santo Domingo to Miami, catches fire at Miami International Airport after landing due to the landing gear collapsing causing a runway excursion. There were three minor injuries among the 140 passengers and crew on board. The aircraft was damaged beyond repair and thus written off.
 July 16 – Meridian Flight 3032, an Antonov An-12 carrying weapons and ammunition cargo from Niš, Serbia to Dhaka, Bangladesh, crashes near Kavala in Greece, killing all 8 on board.
 July 18 – In the 2022 Jubba Airways crash, a Fokker 50 operated by Jubba Airways crashes and rolls over while landing in Mogadishu, Somalia, injuring 16 of the 36 occupants on board.
 September 4 – In the 2022 Mutiny Bay plane crash, a DHC-3 Turbine Otter carrying tourists from Friday Harbor Seaplane Base to Renton Municipal Airport, Washington, nosedives into the sea, killing all 10 on board.
 October 23 – Korean Air Flight 631, an Airbus A330-300 flying from Seoul-Incheon International Airport, overshoots the runway on its third landing attempt at Mactan-Cebu International Airport, Philippines due to poor weather conditions. There are no injuries among the 173 passengers and crew but the aircraft is damaged beyond repair alongside the ILS systems at the airport.
 November 6 – Precision Air Flight 494, an ATR 42-500 flying a domestic flight from Dar es Salaam, crashes into Lake Victoria while attempting to land at Bukoba Airport, Tanzania. Of the 43 people on board, 19 die.
 November 18 – LATAM Perú Flight 2213, an Airbus A320neo-271N operated by LATAM Chile taking off from Lima to Juliaca, collides with a fire engine crossing the runway, killing two firefighters and injuring a third. All 102 passengers and 6 crew aboard escaped unharmed. This is the first hull loss of an A320neo.

2023 

 January 2 – In the 2023 Gold Coast mid-air collision, two Eurocopter EC130 helicopters operated by Sea World Helicopters undertaking tourist trips collide over the city of Gold Coast, Queensland, Australia. There are 4 fatalities and 9 survivors.
 January 15 – Yeti Airlines Flight 691, an ATR 72-500 operating a domestic flight from Tribhuvan International Airport to Pokhara International Airport, crashes into the gorge of the Seti Gandaki River in Pokhara, Nepal. All 72 people aboard are killed. The crash is the deadliest involving the ATR 72.
 February 6 – In the 2023 Coulson Aviation crash, a Boeing 737-300 owned by Coulson Aviation used as an air tanker, crashes at Fitzgerald River National Park in the Great Southern Region in Western Australia while fighting multiple fires. Both occupants on board survive but sustain minor injuries.

External links 
 Aircraft Crash Record Office
 The Aviation Herald
 Aviation Safety Network
 Jet Airliner Crash Data Evaluation Centre
 PlaneCrashInfo.com
 

Accidents and incidents
Commercial aircraft